= Old River (New Hampshire) =

- Location within New Hampshire Location within the United States

Location
- Country: United States
- State: New Hampshire
- County: Rockingham
- Town: Hampton

Physical characteristics
- Source
  - location: Hampton
  - coordinates: 42°57′2″N 70°50′10″W
  - elevation: 70 ft (21 m)
- Mouth: Taylor River
  - location: Hampton
  - coordinates: 42°56′50″N 70°52′41″W
  - elevation: 10 ft (3.0 m)
- Length: 3.1 mi (5.0 km)

The Old River is a 3.1-mile-long (5.0 km) stream located in southeastern New Hampshire in the United States. It is a tributary of the Taylor River, the primary tributary of the Hampton River estuary connected to the Atlantic Ocean.

The river's entire course is within Hampton, New Hampshire. It rises north of the center of town, in a wetland, and flows west, past the Interstate 95/NH 101 interchange at the Hampton tollbooths. The river continues southwest, passing through Car Barn Pond, and reaches the Taylor River upstream from Coffins Mill.

== See also ==
- List of rivers of New Hampshire
