= Seabrook Beach, New Hampshire =

Census-designated place in New Hampshire, United States

- Census-designated place
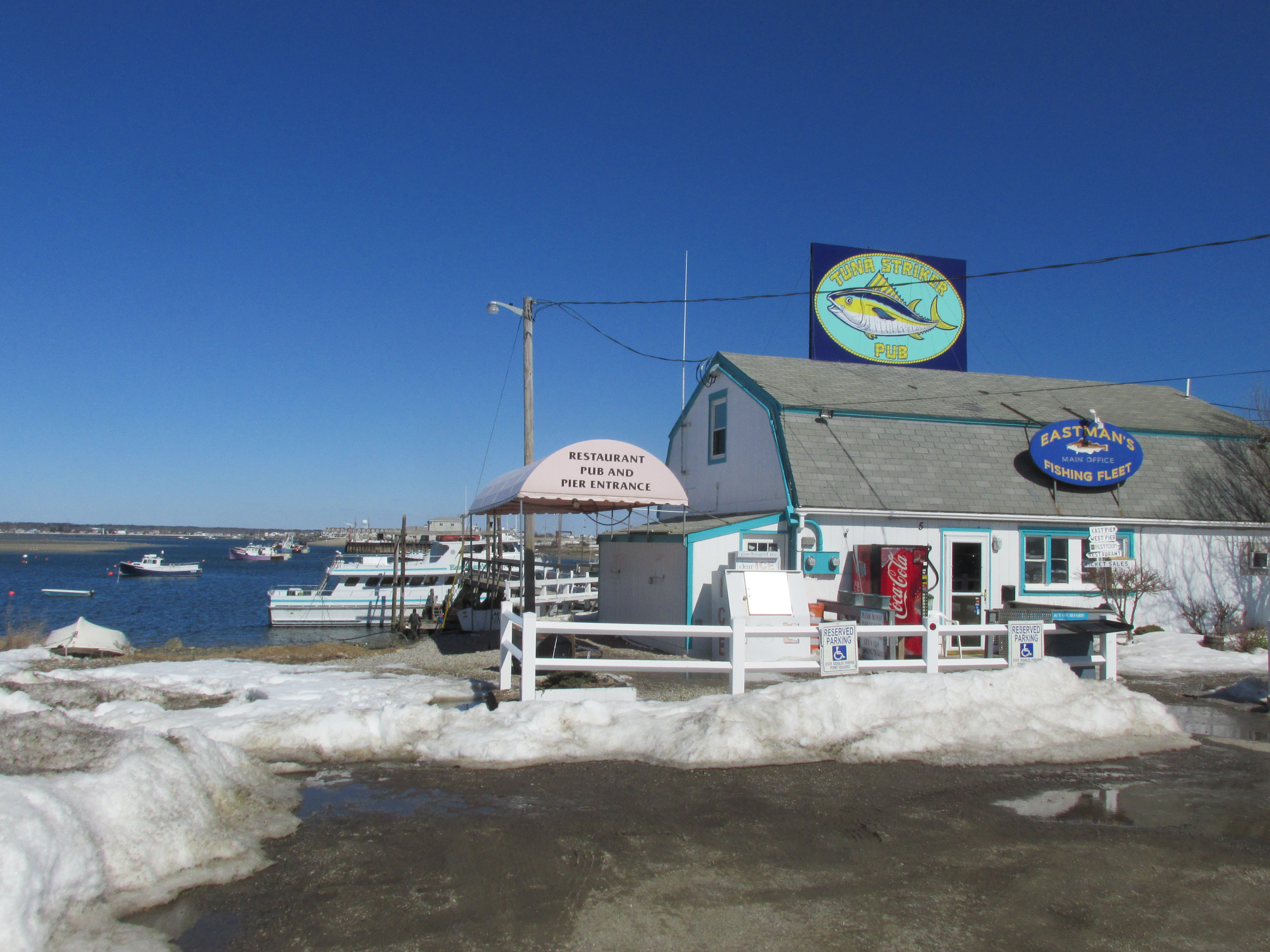
- Eastman's Fishing Fleet

- Location in Rockingham County and the state of New Hampshire.
- Coordinates: 42°53′05″N 70°49′23″W
- Country: United States
- State: New Hampshire
- County: Rockingham
- Town: Seabrook

Area
  - Total: 1.47 sq mi (3.80 km^{2})
  - Land: 1.05 sq mi (2.71 km^{2})
  - Water: 0.42 sq mi (1.09 km^{2})
- Elevation: 03 ft (0.91 m)

Population (2020)
  - Total: 1,078
  - Density: 1,030/sq mi (397.6/km^{2})
- Time zone: UTC-5 (Eastern (EST))
  - Summer (DST): UTC-4 (EDT)
- Area code: 603
- FIPS code: 33-68340
- GNIS feature ID: 2629739

Seabrook Beach is a census-designated place in the town of Seabrook and partially in the town of Hampton, New Hampshire, United States. It had a population of 1,078 at the 2020 census.

== Geography ==
The CDP is a compact area of homes between the tidal Blackwater River and the Atlantic Ocean. The community extends from the mouth of the Hampton River in the north to the Massachusetts state line in the south. Most of the CDP is in the eastern part of the town of Seabrook, but the northern end of the CDP, consisting of Thornton Street, Campton Street, Plymouth Street, and parts of Woodstock and Ashland streets, is in the town of Hampton.

NH 1A leads north from Seabrook Beach across the Hampton Bridge into Hampton Beach, while to the south the highway becomes Massachusetts Route 1A in the town of Salisbury. New Hampshire Route 286 runs west from Route 1A at the southern end of Seabrook Beach; it leads 2.5 miles (4.0 km) to U.S. Route 1 in the northwestern part of Salisbury.

According to the U.S. Census Bureau, the Seabrook Beach CDP has a total area of 1.47 square miles (3.80 km^{2}), of which 1.05 square miles (2.71 km^{2}) are land and 0.42 square miles (1.09 km^{2}), or 28.71%, are water.

== Demographics ==
Historical population
Census	Pop.	Note	%±
2010	992		—
2020	1,078		8.7%
U.S. Decennial Census

As of the census of 2010, there were 992 people, 524 households, and 273 families residing in the CDP. There were 1,042 housing units, of which 518, or 49.7%, were vacant. 429 of the vacant units were seasonal or vacation properties. The racial makeup of the CDP was 98.7% white, 0.1% African American, 0.2% Native American, 0.2% Asian, and 0.8% from two or more races. 0.7% of the population were Hispanic or Latino of any race.

Of the 524 households in the CDP, 10.5% had children under the age of 18 living with them, 40.3% were headed by married couples living together, 7.4% had a female householder with no husband present, and 47.9% were non-families. 41.6% of all households were made up of individuals, and 18.1% were someone living alone who was 65 years of age or older. The average household size was 1.89, and the average family size was 2.51.

9.2% of residents in the CDP were under the age of 18, 5.7% were from age 18 to 24, 14.6% were from 25 to 44, 39.2% were from 45 to 64, and 31.1% were 65 years of age or older. The median age was 56.5 years. For every 100 females, there were 94.9 males. For every 100 females age 18 and over, there were 91.7 males.

For the period 2011–15, the estimated median annual income for a household was $66,318, and the median income for a family was $81,283. The per capita income for the CDP was $45,450.
