= PSNH =

Electric Utility in the U.S. state of New Hampshire

Public Service of New Hampshire
- Type: Public
- Industry: Utility
- Founded: 1926
- Area served: New Hampshire
- Products: transmission, distribution and generation

The logo for PSNH at the time it was bought by Northeast Utilities

Public Service of New Hampshire, commonly known as PSNH, is the largest public utility in the U.S. state of New Hampshire. Founded in 1926, it sold natural gas and electricity, and for a time ran electric street-railway services and, later, bus service. The company was bought in 1992 by Northeast Utilities and is a subsidiary of Eversource Energy, its corporate successor.

== History ==
Large-scale electricity production came to New Hampshire in 1882 when the New England Weston Electric Light Company of Boston built a generating station in Manchester, on the property of the Amoskeag Manufacturing Company. In 1885 the Manchester Electric Light Company bought the Weston property in the city and in 1901 merged with the Manchester Traction, Light and Power Company - so named because electric trolley cars, the "traction" portion of the name, were a major customer of electricity producers. PSNH records indicate that at least 39 small electric companies that were in business before 1900 were combined over the years. PSNH was incorporated in 1926 as a consolidation of five existing independent electric companies in New Hampshire.

In 1935 the Public Utility Holding Company Act was passed, setting the stage for PSNH to become a regulated utility. In 1946 the company went public.

Among the power plants that the company built are Schiller Generation Station, three coal-fired units in Portsmouth, New Hampshire, which when opened in 1950 was the country's first fully integrated binary cycle plant, and the Seabrook Station nuclear power plant in Seabrook, New Hampshire, which began operating in 1990. Cost and deadline overruns in the construction of Seabrook Station caused PSNH to declare bankruptcy in 1998, the first investor-owned utility to go bankrupt since the Great Depression. That led to its sale to what was then Northeast Utilities, since renamed Eversource Energy.

In 2018 Eversource sold all the former PSNH power plants, including a number of hydropower dams and gas-fired power plants, to a group of investors known as Granite Shore Power LLC, as the final step in electricity deregulation.
