= Warren Brown (politician) =

American politician (1836–1919)

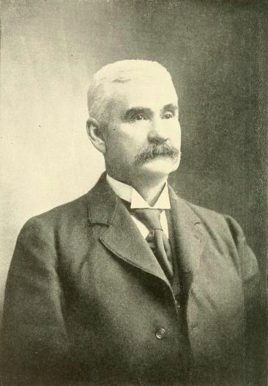
- Born: August 11, 1836; Hampton Falls, New Hampshire
- Died: November 19, 1919 (aged 83)
- Resting place: Westview Cemetery, Hampton Falls, New Hampshire
- Occupations: Farmer, politician, historian
- Years active: c. 1872 – c. 1908
- Notable work: History of Hampton Falls, N.H.
- Spouse: Sarah Gertrude Norris
- Children: 5

Warren Brown (August 11, 1836 – September 19, 1919) was an American politician, historian, gentleman farmer, businessman, and author from Hampton Falls, New Hampshire.

== Biography ==
=== Early life ===
Warren Brown was born in Hampton Falls, New Hampshire, the only child of John Berry and Sarah March Leavitt Brown. He was educated in the North School in Hampton Falls, the old Rockingham Academy in Hampton, and Phillips-Andover Academy in Andover, Massachusetts.

=== Later life ===
Brown married Sarah Gertrude Norris on January 1, 1867. Sarah was a daughter of Daniel L. Norris and Sophia (Osgood) Norris, of Raymond, NH. She was born in Dover, NH on November 17, 1841. From the age of 10, Sarah was raised by her aunt Lavinia Osgood and uncle, Samuel Meserve in Lowell, Massachusetts, where she received her public-school education. She subsequently moved with the Meserves to Hampton, NH, where she taught in the public schools until her marriage.

Warren and Sarah had five children:

- Norris (August 4, 1868 – August 4, 1868)
- Harry Benson (June 8, 1870 – June 18, 1903)
- Arthur Warren (July 20, 1873 – 1960) married Frances Wadleigh (1881–1966) on October 11, 1906
  - Their children:
  - Charles Warren Brown (July 16, 1909)
  - Lois Wadleigh (May 2, 1911)
  - Harold Arthur (July 31, 1913)
  - Elinor Frances (December 12, 1915)
  - Ernest Norris (January 13, 1918
  - Winthrop Marshall (February 3, 1921)
- Gertrude Norris (May 17, 1878 – May 17, 1896)
- Mildred Leavitt (April 3, 1880 – December 5, 1965) married Roscoe Franklin Swain (1881–1946) on June 11, 1908
  - Their children:
  - Marjorie Morrill (July 9, 1909 – July 16, 1909)
  - Pearl Elizabeth (February 2, 1911 – November 23, 1986)
  - Kenneth Warren (August 9, 1913 – September 6, 2003)
  - Dorothy Gertrude (June 30, 1918 – February 17, 2011)

Sarah Brown died on January 24, 1917, after celebrating the couple's Golden Wedding anniversary on January 1st. She was eulogized by her husband as being a "person of great executive ability and force of character." Sarah kept diaries, noting her daily activities as well as current events happening in her town, country and world. The collection ranging in dates from 1870-1916 is housed in the Special Collections and University Archives at the Dimond Library at the University of New Hampshire. It is a part of the Brown, Warren & Sarah Norris Family Collection.

Brown had a lifelong interest in agricultural matters. He managed and worked one of the largest and most productive farms in Rockingham County. His farm included orchards, salt marsh, dairy cattle, sheep and gardens sufficient to maintain his family and the employees for whom he provided room and board. He sent to markets the excess of his crops as well as processed dairy and fruit (cider and vinegar) products which were made on the property in specialized outbuildings. He was a believer in the "scientific approach to agriculture" and contributed to the literature of the time, articles based on his experiments with crops and animal husbandry.

Brown was president of the New Hampshire State Agricultural Society for eleven years, treasurer of the New England Agricultural Society for twenty-five years, trustee of the New Hampshire College of Agriculture and the Mechanic Arts for 24 years, including four years served as chairman of the board. In this capacity he helped plan and execute the move of the College from Hanover, NH where it was started to the campus in Durham, NH.

In addition to agricultural interests, Brown was active in state politics. He was a State Senator in 1872–73, a member of the State's Executive Council from 1879 to 1881 during the term of Natt Head as Governor, and a Delegate to the 1884 Republican National Convention in Chicago, Illinois. He was a State Representative in 1887, and a presidential elector in 1908. He was also elected to an unprecedented second term to the State House of Representatives in his last year of life, 1919. Brown was also a 33rd degree Mason Freemason. Brown was a stockholder and active promoter of the electric railways in southern New Hampshire, and owned and operated a sawmill on his estate.

Brown was a true native son, descended from many of the original settlers of the New Hampshire Seacoast Region, and passionate about recording his town's history. He wrote the two-volume history of Hampton Falls: History of Hampton Falls, N.H. Volume I and History of Hampton Falls, N.H. Volume II. Volume I spans from 1640 to 1900, while Volume II spans from 1900 to 1917.

=== Death ===
Brown died September 19, 1919. He was buried in the family lot in the Westview Cemetery of Hampton Falls. He was predeceased by his wife Sarah, his daughter Gertrude and his son Harry.

== Residence ==
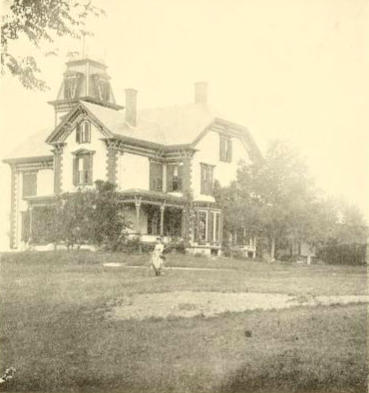
Brown's residence, Sunnyside, as published in his History of Hampton Falls, N.H.

Brown owned and operated a highly successful farm on family land purchased by his father in 1812. On this property, in 1880, he built a Victorian style home which replaced his parents' center-chimney colonial house. This new home, called Sunnyside, was designed by his beloved wife Sarah Gertrude; architectural plans were drawn for her by a Mr. Bruce of Newburyport, Massachusetts. The house remained in the family until the 1960s. Its unique presence in a town of mainly colonial styled architecture, its resemblance to The Addams Family house and the years between owners when it was vacant, have perhaps helped to make it the source of speculation by locals and newcomers alike.

For many years, a rumor circulated stating that Brown made an unsuccessful run for Governor of New Hampshire and that his Victorian style house was built in anticipation of its being "the Governor's mansion", a name it became known by. In truth, his wife Sarah, a woman of innovation and industry, designed Sunnyside to be a practical and beautiful home where the couple could live in comfort, entertain in style and operate their large estate with efficiency.

After numerous experiences, the current owners brought in paranormal teams to explore spectral activity on this property and had it investigated in 2012 by The Atlantic Paranormal Society ( T.A.P.S.) for the Syfy television series Ghost Hunters.

== Legacy ==
Brown Road, abutting his former property in Hampton Falls, is named for Warren Brown. His volumes chronicling the history of Hampton Falls have continued to be invaluable resources for genealogists, historians, and related fields. The Thompson School of Agriculture at the University of New Hampshire and the Durham campus of which it is a part came into being because of the dedication of the Board of Trustees of which Warren Brown was an active, long-time member.

== Sources ==
- Brown, Marguerite Willette. Genealogy of John Brown of Hampton, New Hampshire, 1977, Hillside Publishing Co., Amesbury, Massachusetts.
- Crowell, Suzanne Perfect. Sunnyside Files. 1976. Offset House, South Burlington, Vermont.
- Newspaper clipping from The Union, dated August 11, 1919
- Diaries of Warren and Sarah Brown, held in the University of New Hampshire Special Collections and Archives
- Interviews with descendants of Warren and Sarah Brown
