= Browns River =

Browns River may refer to:

Australia

- Browns River (Tasmania)

Canada

- Browns River (Vancouver Island)

United States

- Browns River (New Hampshire)
- Browns River (Vermont)
