= Drakes River =

- Location within New Hampshire Location within the United States

Location
- Country: United States
- State: New Hampshire
- County: Rockingham
- Town: Hampton

Physical characteristics
- Source
  - location: Hampton
  - coordinates: 42°57′1″N 70°51′24″W
  - elevation: 50 ft (15 m)
- Mouth: Taylor River
  - location: Hampton
  - coordinates: 42°55′30″N 70°51′8″W
  - elevation: 0 ft (0 m)
- Length: 2.1 mi (3.4 km)

The Drakes River is a 2.1-mile (3.4 km) long stream located in southeastern New Hampshire in the United States. It is a tributary of the Taylor River, a tidal inlet (via the Hampton River) of the Atlantic Ocean.

The river rises in an office park just southeast of the Interstate 95/NH 101 interchange in Hampton, New Hampshire. It flows south, through Coffin Pond, and reaches the Taylor River just west of the Route 1 crossing of the Hampton saltmarsh.

== See also ==
- List of rivers of New Hampshire
