= Browns River (New Hampshire) =

- Location within New Hampshire Location within the United States

Location
- Country: United States
- State: New Hampshire
- County: Rockingham
- Towns: Seabrook, Hampton Falls

Physical characteristics
- Source
  - location: Seabrook
  - coordinates: 42°53′49″N 70°52′7″W
  - elevation: 40 ft (12 m)
- Mouth: Hampton Harbor
  - location: Seabrook, Hampton Falls
  - coordinates: 42°53′44″N 70°50′7″W
  - elevation: 0 ft (0 m)
- Length: 2.9 mi (4.7 km)

Basin features
- Tributaries
  - left: Swains Creek
  - right: Hunts Island Creek

The Browns River is a 2.9-mile-long (4.7 km) river, primarily tidal, in southeastern New Hampshire in the United States. It is part of the largest salt marsh in New Hampshire, covering over 3,800 acres (15 km^{2}).

The river rises in the town of Seabrook just east of U.S. Route 1 and quickly enters the salt marsh and tidewater. For most of its length, the river forms the boundary between Seabrook and Hampton Falls. The river runs along the north side of Seabrook Station Nuclear Power Plant, then ends in Hampton Harbor, where it joins the Hampton River.

== See also ==
- List of rivers of New Hampshire
