= Taylor River (New Hampshire) =

- Location within New Hampshire Location within the United States

Location
- Country: United States
- State: New Hampshire
- County: Rockingham
- Town: Kensington, Hampton Falls, Hampton

Physical characteristics
- Source
  - location: Kensington
  - coordinates: 42°55′16″N 70°55′56″W
  - elevation: 80 ft (24 m)
- Mouth: Hampton River
  - location: Hampton
  - coordinates: 42°54′47″N 70°50′44″W
  - elevation: 0 ft (0 m)
- Length: 10.6 mi (17.1 km)

Basin features
- Tributaries
  - left: Ash Brook, Old River, Drakes River, Landing Brook
  - right: Clay Brook, Grapevine Run, Kenney Brook

The Taylor River is a 10.6-mile-long (17.1 km) river located in southeastern New Hampshire in the United States. It is a tributary of the Hampton River, a tidal inlet of the Atlantic Ocean. Approximately two miles of the Taylor River are tidal.

The river rises on the eastern side of Kensington, New Hampshire. It flows east into the town of Hampton Falls and follows a winding course north, then east, then southeast through the rolling lowlands of the region, reaching tidewater at a dam and fish ladder where Interstate 95 crosses the river. For the lower four miles of the river, it forms the boundary between Hampton Falls and Hampton, New Hampshire. The freshwater portion of the river is an active recreation area for summer fishing, kayaking and canoeing. Ice fishing and cross country skiing are also pastimes here.

== History ==
The Taylor River was named for Anthony Taylor, one of the founders of Hampton. Born in England between 1607 and 1611, he arrived in America, with his wife Phillipa, on the Anne and Elizabeth in 1635. Thereafter a lifelong resident of Hampton, he "became a valuable and leading man" by virtue of his heavy involvement with local government. Taylor was a feltmaker but was also a tavern keeper and constable, and performed many other functions in the Hampton area. Anthony Taylor died in Hampton on November 4, 1687, at the age of 80. He was preceded in death by Phillipa, who died in Hampton on September 20, 1683. Anthony and Phillipa are thought to be the oldest known Taylors in America and have descendants spread across the North and South American continents.

== See also ==
- List of rivers of New Hampshire
