= Hampton Falls River =

- Location within New Hampshire Location within the United States

Location
- Country: United States
- State: New Hampshire
- County: Rockingham
- Towns: Kensington, Seabrook, Hampton Falls

Physical characteristics
- Source
  - location: Kensington
  - coordinates: 42°54′13″N 70°55′41″W
  - elevation: 110 ft (34 m)
- Mouth: Hampton River
  - location: Hampton Falls
  - coordinates: 42°54′47″N 70°50′44″W
  - elevation: 0 ft (0 m)
- Length: 5.6 mi (9.0 km)

Basin features
- Tributaries
  - left: Winkley Brook
  - right: Gove Brook

The Hampton Falls River is a 5.6-mile-long (9.0 km) river in southeastern New Hampshire in the United States. Its lower reaches are tidal, as part of the Hampton salt marsh close to the Atlantic Ocean.

The river rises in the southeast corner of Kensington and travels east into Seabrook. The river approximately follows the boundary between Seabrook and Hampton Falls, crossing it three times. It passes Weares Mill and eventually heads northeast into Hampton Falls. Approaching the town center, it passes through the chain of three Dodge Ponds, dropping 10 feet (3 m) over the "Hampton Falls" before entering the final one. Crossing under U.S. Route 1, the river enters the Hampton salt marsh, where it ends at the Hampton River.

== See also ==
- List of rivers of New Hampshire
