= Applecrest Farm Orchards =

Orchard in New Hampshire, United States

Coordinates: 42°55′53.46″N 70°53′20.27″W

- Industry: Orchard and farm
- Founded: 1913
- Founder: Walter Baldwin Farmer
- Headquarters: Hampton Falls, New Hampshire, U.S.
- Products: Apples, peaches, corn, and vegetables
- Owner: Peter Wagner
- Website: www.applecrest.com

Applecrest Farm Orchards (also known as Applecrest Orchards or simply Applecrest) is a year-round apple orchard in Hampton Falls, New Hampshire. It is considered the oldest and largest apple orchard in the state of New Hampshire and the oldest continuously operated apple orchard in the United States, having opened in 1913.

== History ==
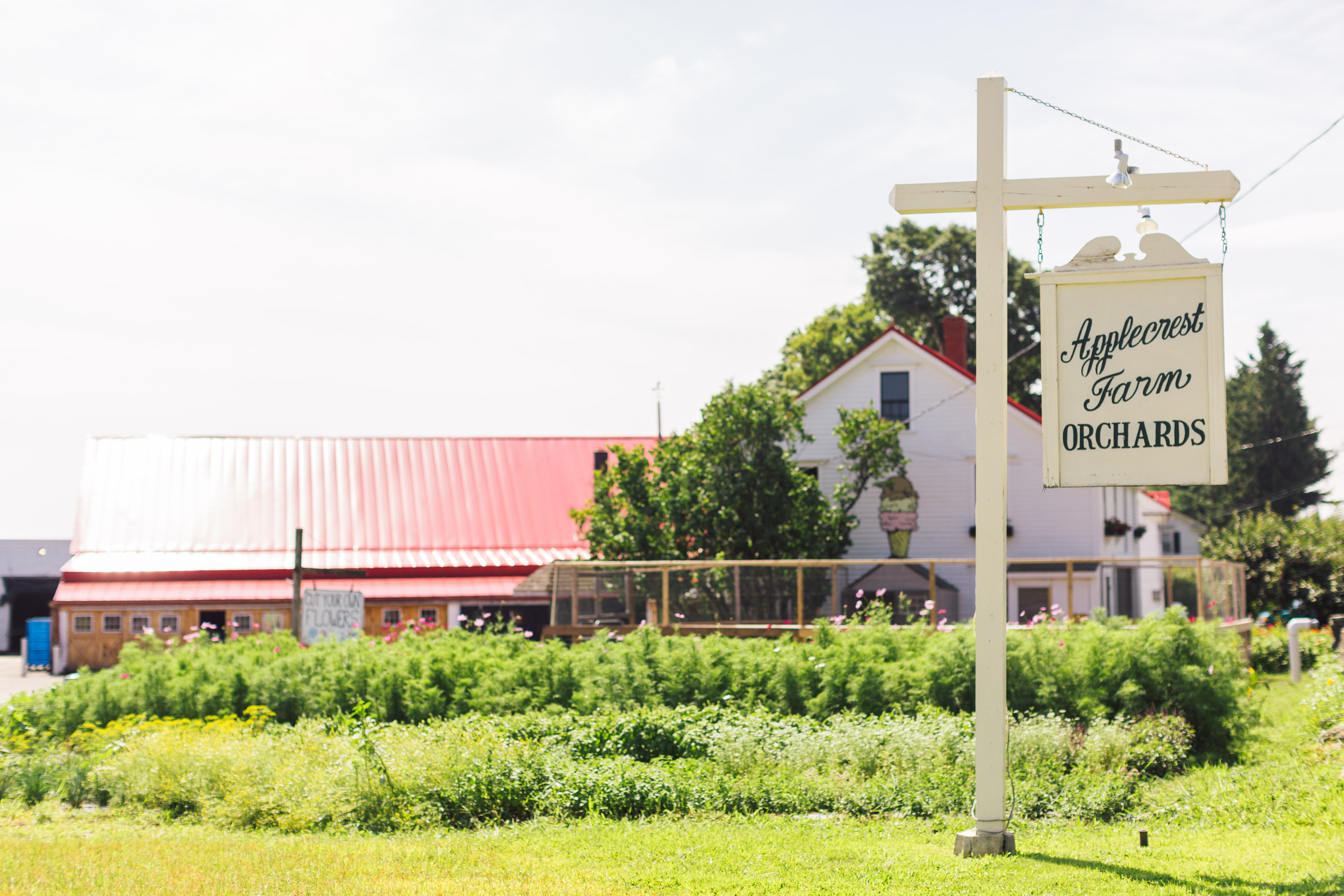
Applecrest Farm Orchards

The land Applecrest Orchards lies upon was first settled in 1665 by James Prescott, having immigrated from Digby, Lincolnshire, England, that year. At the time, Prescott's parcel was part of the town of Hampton, within the boundaries of the "Old County of Norfolk", part of the Massachusetts Bay Colony. For thirty years, he resided on the farm in a garrison house, known as Prescott's Fort. His house was fortified due to tensions with local indigenous people. In 1679, Hampton and three other settlements were separated from Massachusetts to form the Province of New Hampshire. In 1725, Prescott moved to Kingston, New Hampshire, and lived there until his death, three years later. His grandson Ebenezer Prescott inherited the large parcel of land. Around this time, Hampton Falls was incorporated as a separate town.

Aaron Wells of Ipswich, Massachusetts, purchased the land from Ebenezer's descendants in 1774. His sole child, Eunice, married Newell Healey of the neighboring town, Kensington. Their son, Wells, inherited the farm after his maternal grandfather's death in 1819. Wells married Elizabeth Pickering of the nearby town of North Hampton. Wells died in 1857, and one of his sons, Newell H., became the owner of the large farm.

In 1913, Walter Baldwin Farmer with his wife, Gertrude, and their two daughters, moved from Brookline, Massachusetts, and purchased the farm. He set his mind on making the tract into a prosperous business. He purchased adjacent properties, dredged brooks, dynamited boulders, and studied the latest methods on tree maintenance. It was around this time that the first apple tree was planted, effectively establishing Applecrest Farm Orchards. Farmer spent the first ten years of his ownership of the orchard waiting for the several thousand apple trees he planted to fully mature. During this period, his source of revenue came from nearly 200 chicken houses that dotted the hilly landscape.

Applecrest Orchards is considered the oldest and largest apple orchard in the state of New Hampshire and the oldest continuously operated apple orchard in the United States. Many of the buildings on the grounds were built before the establishment of the business, including the farm market, built in 1812, and the home of the Wagners, built in 1815 by Wells Healey.

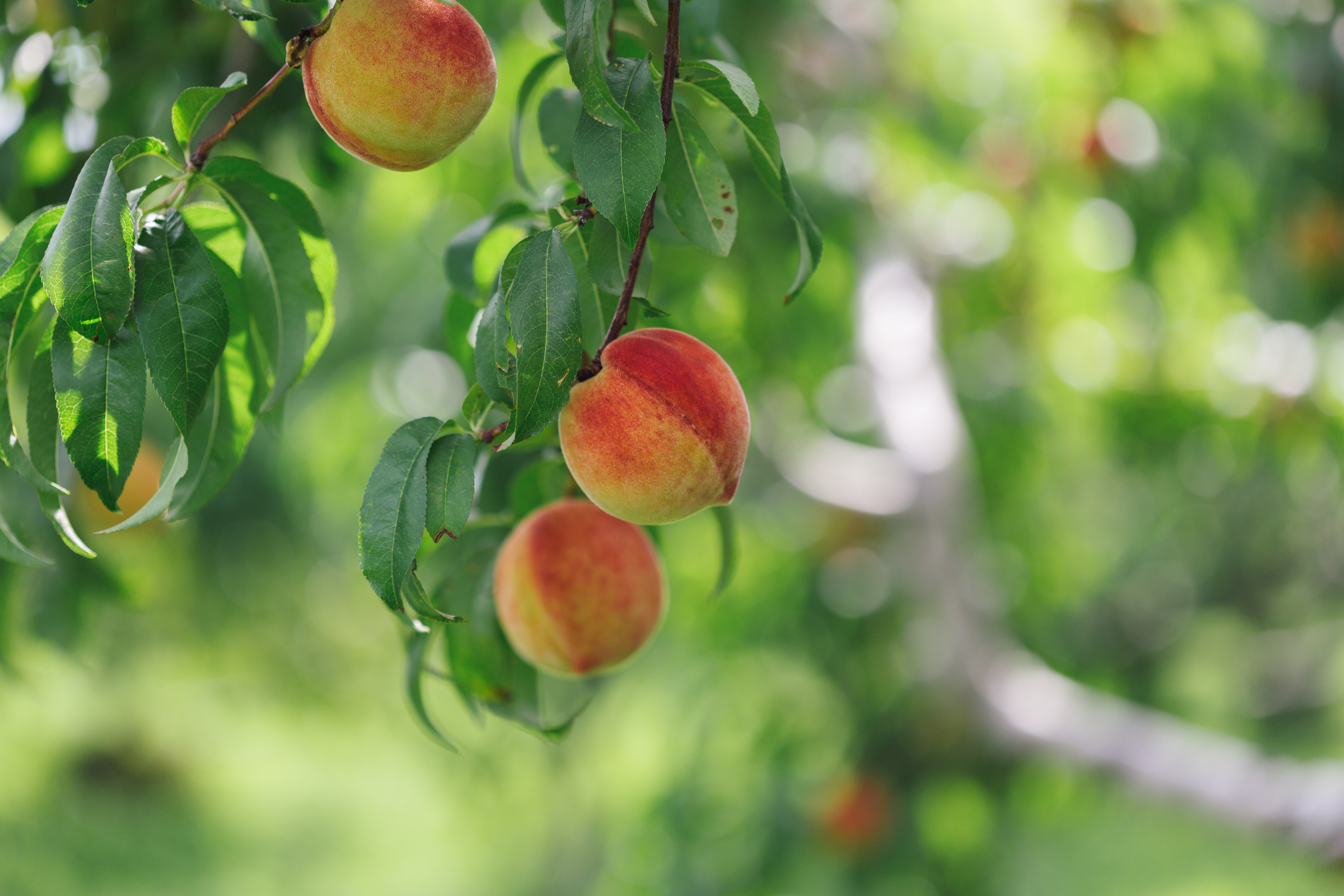
Peaches at Applecrest

After Farmer's death, Applecrest was briefly sold to Major Platts before changing hands again in 1954 when the orchard was bought by William L. and Jean Wagner of New York. Despite being unfamiliar with apple tree maintenance at first, they decided to familiarize themselves and continue the business. The orchard continues to operate under the ownership of the Wagner family. When Bill died in 1984, Jean continued as the sole owner. Future author, John Irving, worked at Applecrest; as he notes in The Cider House Rules, Jean and Bill Wagner gave him his "first job."

In 1985, Applecrest covered 500 acres (2.0 km^{2}) of land, but the increased cost of maintaining the orchard meant that land had to be sold to consolidate; 44 acres (180,000 m^{2}) of that land was sold to developers that year and divided into 18 house lots. In the late 1980s, another 33-acre (130,000 m^{2}) parcel off Sanborn Road was subdivided into 12 lots. Additional sections of land, mostly along the main roads in Hampton Falls, have been sold off as well. 10 acres (40,000 m^{2}) became four house lots in the early 1990s, a 12-lot subdivision called Coburn Woods was developed, and by the dawn of the millennium, 6 acres (24,000 m^{2}) off Route 88 (Exeter Road) became a three-lot subdivision, conforming in every instance to the town's 2-acre (8,100 m^{2})-per-house zoning ordinance. As of 2014, Applecrest is only 124 acres (0.50 km^{2}) in size, a fraction of its former expanse.

In addition to the orchard, two markets were run by the Wagners on U.S. Route 1 in Hampton Falls and at the junction of Routes 110 and 150 in Amesbury, Massachusetts. The former markets were each known as the Applemart until they closed in 2004. In 2005, the owners of the farm were Ben and Peter Wagner, the sons of Jean and Bill. In 2006, Peter Wagner purchased the farm and became the sole owner of Applecrest.

In celebration of Applecrest's 100th anniversary, the orchard announced it was erecting and opening a new "farm-to-table" restaurant on the property. All of the products served to the customer will have been grown or raised on their property. The project is expected to be completed by the end of 2014.

== Produce ==
Currently, the orchard grows approximately 40,000 bushels of more than 40 different varieties of apples, including McIntosh, Cortland, Macoun, Ida Red, and Red Delicious. Other available foods include various vegetables, sweet corn, and peaches.
