= Benjamin James House =

Historic house in New Hampshire, United States

- U.S. National Register of Historic Places
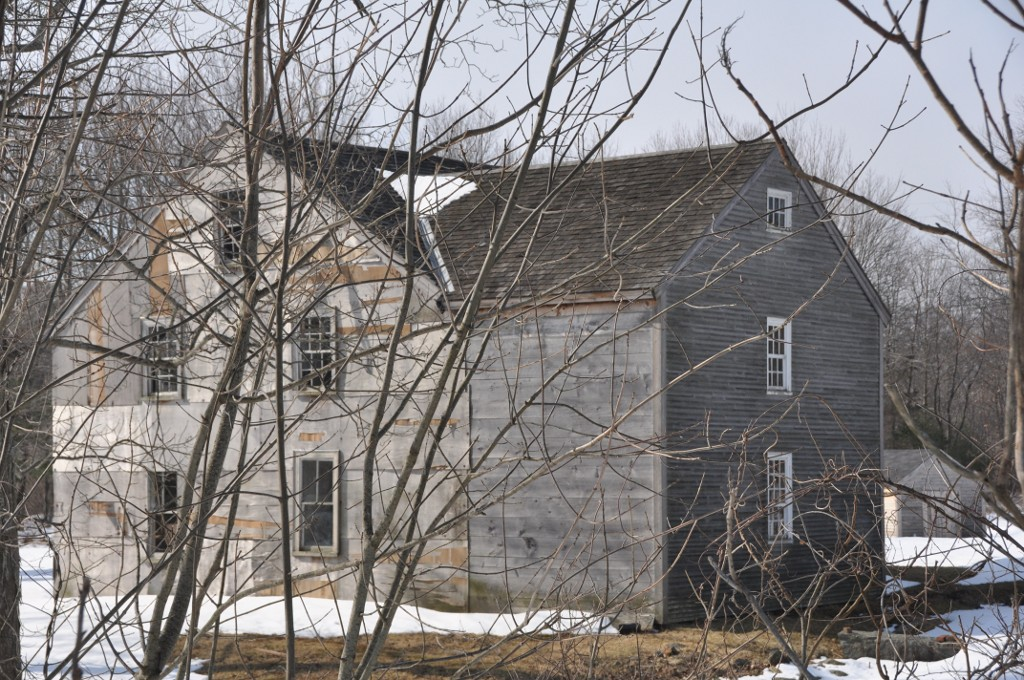

- Location within New Hampshire Location within the United States
- Location: 186 Towle Farm Rd., Hampton, New Hampshire
- Coordinates: 42°56′31″N 70°51′44″W
- Area: 1.1 acres (0.45 ha)
- Built: 1723
- Architectural style: Colonial
- NRHP reference No.: 02000168
- Added to NRHP: March 13, 2002

The Benjamin James House is a historic house museum at 186 Towle Farm Road in Hampton, New Hampshire. Built in 1723, it is believed to be the oldest surviving example in New Hampshire of the traditional five-bay Georgian Colonial house, with a possibly older building attached as an ell. Now owned by a local nonprofit organization, it is open selected days between May and October, or by appointment. The house was listed on the National Register of Historic Places in 2002.

== Description and history ==
The Benjamin James House is located in a rural setting on the south side of Towle Farm Road, just west of Interstate 95. The house is oriented facing south (away from the street), toward an old road alignment. It is a 2 1/2-story wood-frame structure, with a side-gable roof, central chimney, and clapboarded exterior. A two-story ell projects north from the back of the house. The main house is built with a heavy timber frame consisting of four bents running front-to-back, joined by horizontal timber beams. Each bent has three posts, which support the roof framing and the summer beams defining the partition between the front and rear chambers. The ell exhibits similar First Period construction techniques, whose forms are consistent with the idea that it was all or part of the first house built on the property, c. 1707. The main house timbers have been dated by dendrochronology to 1723.

The land on which the house stands was purchased in 1705 by Benjamin James, a weaver. By 1722 James owned 30 acres (12 ha), and had eight children, prompting construction of this larger house the following year. The house remained in the James family until 1931, undergoing a number of alterations, mainly to its interior features and finishes. The largest-scale alterations were the removal of the original central chimney late in the 19th century, at which time the house also received new windows (although at least one of its original window sashes was found in the attic). Vacant and in deteriorating condition, it was purchased in 1995 by the James House Association, a local non-profit dedicated to its preservation.

== See also ==
- National Register of Historic Places listings in Rockingham County, New Hampshire
