= Seabrook Station Nuclear Power Plant =

Nuclear power plant in Seabrook, New Hampshire

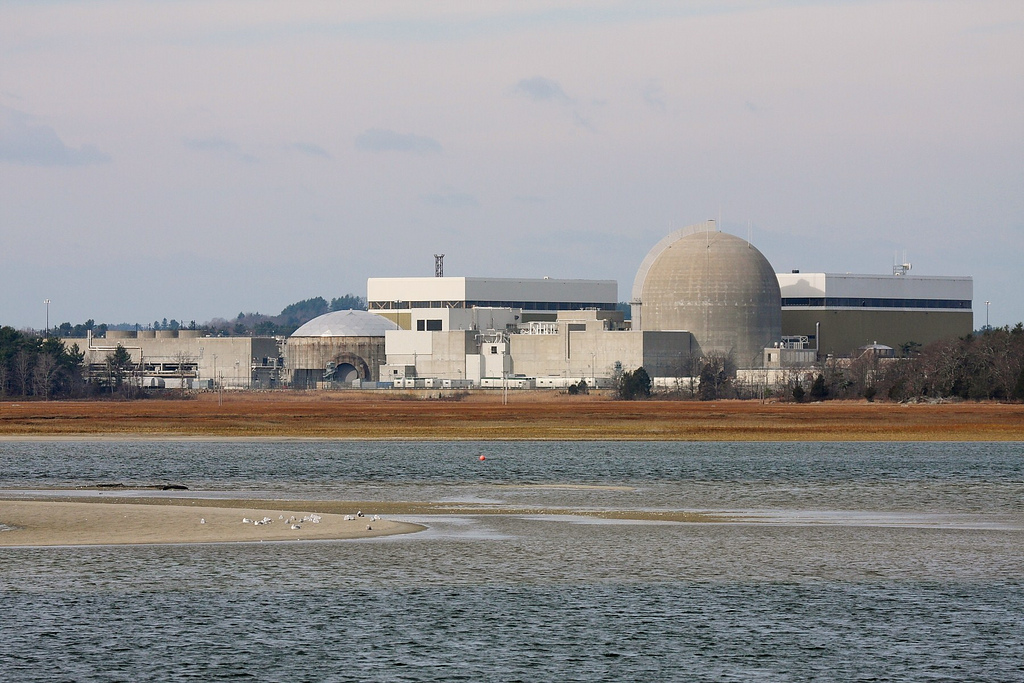
- Seabrook Station (2009)
- Official name: Seabrook Station
- Country: United States
- Location: Seabrook, New Hampshire
- Coordinates: 42°53′56″N 70°51′03″W
- Status: Operational
- Construction began: July 7, 1976; 50 years ago
- Commission date: August 19, 1990; 36 years ago
- Construction cost: $20 billion (2025 USD)
- Owner: NextEra Energy Resources
- Operator: NextEra Energy Resources

Nuclear power station
- Reactor type: PWR
- Reactor supplier: Westinghouse
- Cooling source: Atlantic Ocean
- Thermal capacity: 3648 MW_{th}

Power generation
- Units operational: 1 × 1246 MW
- Make and model: WH 4LP (DRYAMB)
- Units cancelled: 1 × 1149 MW
- Nameplate capacity: 1246 MW
- Capacity factor: 91.53% (2017); 86.7% (lifetime)
- Annual net output: 9093 GWh (2021)

External links
- Website: Seabrook Station
- Commons: Related media on Commons

The Seabrook Nuclear Power Plant, more commonly known as Seabrook Station, is a nuclear power plant located in Seabrook, New Hampshire, United States, approximately 40 miles (64 km) north of Boston and 10 miles (16 km) south of Portsmouth. It has operated since 1990. With its 1,244-megawatt electrical output, Seabrook Unit 1 is the largest individual electrical generating unit on the New England power grid. It is the second largest nuclear plant in New England after the two-unit Millstone Nuclear Power Plant in Connecticut. The station generates approximately 40% of New Hampshire's total electricity and reduces carbon emissions by nearly 4 million tons annually.

Two reactors were planned at Seabrook but the first unit did not begin full operation until 1990, a full 14 years after the construction permit was granted, and the second unit was never built due to construction delays caused by protests, cost overruns, and troubles obtaining financing. The difficulties led to the bankruptcy of Seabrook's utility owner, PSNH. Since 2002, Seabrook Station has been owned and operated by NextEra Energy Resources.

== History ==
=== Seabrook Station construction ===
The Public Service Company of New Hampshire (PSNH) initially sought plans for building a nuclear power plant in 1966. PSNH initially planned for building the plant in Newington, but the construction permit was denied after concerns of the proposed site being too close to Pease Air Force Base. After the new location of Seabrook was selected, construction plans were finalized in 1972. PSNH originally proposed the first unit coming online by 1979, the second unit coming online by 1981, and a total cost of less than $1 billion.

PSNH and the state Public Utilities Commission expected little opposition in constructing Seabrook Station, and even the Union Leader reported, "Management of Public Service does not anticipate difficulties in obtaining the necessary licenses and permits for the Seabrook site because it is not near an air base [as was Newington, its first choice for a site], and condenser cooling water can be discharged directly to deep water in the Atlantic Ocean." When the construction and operation plans were presented to the town of Seabrook, the plans "were met with an enthusiastic response" and were unanimously approved.

Construction began in August 1976 with cooperation amongst sixteen utility groups. However, numerous problems led to construction delays. In the fall of 1976, the New England regional administrator of the Environmental Protection Agency rejected the cooling tunnel discharge system, which would have disallowed operation of the plant, but the decision was appealed and later overturned in 1978. For several years during construction there were many protests and acts of civil disobedience, the largest of which was in 1977 and had over 1,400 arrests. The Three Mile Island accident in 1979 diminished outside interest in financing and buying ownership of Seabrook Station. Six surrounding New Hampshire towns within the 10-mile emergency planning radius of Seabrook Station including Hampton refused to provide evacuation planning, and in 1980, the Nuclear Regulatory Commission (NRC) was petitioned to halt construction until those evacuation plans were resolved. The six Massachusetts towns within the 10-mile radius were also opposed to Seabrook Station, which resulted in political opposition, such as from Massachusetts Governor Michael Dukakis, and numerous legal suits during construction.

In 1984, due to continuing financial and regulatory problems, the owners canceled construction of the second reactor unit at 25% completion after $800 million spent. Construction of Reactor Unit 1 was eventually completed in 1986, but shortly thereafter in 1988, the large debt involved led to the bankruptcy of Seabrook's major utility owner, PSNH. At the time, this was the fourth largest bankruptcy in United States corporate history.

The construction of Seabrook Station was completed ten years later than expected, with a cost approaching $7 billion. The NRC described its own regulatory oversight of Seabrook as "a paradigm of fragmented and uncoordinated government decision making," and "a system strangling itself and the economy in red tape."

=== NextEra Energy and recent history ===
The plant was originally owned by more than 10 separate utility companies serving five New England states. In 2002, most sold their shares to FPL Energy (a subsidiary of FPL Group), later known as NextEra Energy Resources, for a controlling 88.2% share of Seabrook Station at a total cost of $836.6 million. The remaining portion is owned by municipal utilities in Massachusetts. The station is one of five nuclear generating facilities operated by parent company NextEra Energy. The other four are St. Lucie Nuclear Power Plant and Turkey Point Nuclear Generating Station operated by sister company Florida Power & Light (a regulated utility), and the Duane Arnold Energy Center and Point Beach Nuclear Generating Station operated by NextEra Energy Resources.

During the 2008 presidential election, Republican nominee John McCain mentioned the possibility of building the once-planned second reactor at Seabrook. The idea drew cautious support from some officials, but would be difficult due to financial and regulatory reasons.

In 2009, the name of the nuclear power plant was officially changed to NextEra Energy Seabrook, but the plant is still widely known and referred to as Seabrook Station.

In 2017, due to the steady drop in value of nuclear power plants including Seabrook Station, the town of Seabrook enacted a 9.9 percent tax increase to offset the decrease in tax revenue collected from the plant's owner, NextEra Energy. In 2019, the New Hampshire House of Representatives introduced House Bill 1661 that would have removed Seabrook Station's property tax exemption for components used to mitigate air and water pollution. In 2020, House Bill 1661 failed to proceed out of the New Hampshire House of Representatives.

In April 2020, Massachusetts members of the U.S. Congress that included U.S. Senators Elizabeth Warren and Ed Markey, and Congressman Seth Moulton called on the Nuclear Regulatory Commission and NextEra Energy to release the pandemic plan for Seabrook Station in response to COVID-19. The letter was submitted in response to the ongoing refueling outage, bringing hundreds of workers on site, with concerns over safety procedures and plant staffing. Seabrook Station was also granted regulatory exemptions from the Nuclear Regulatory Commission to aid in its preventative efforts against the spread of COVID-19 including loosening work-hour controls and deferring certain inspections.

Beginning in the early 2020s, NextEra Energy has been involved in an ongoing dispute with utility company Avangrid over the New England Clean Energy Connect (NECEC) power line being constructed in Maine, which is aimed at bringing hydropower from Canada to the New England power grid. Before being interconnected to the New England electric grid, the additional power delivery would require upgrades to Seabrook Station's main generator breaker, which is being litigated over the cost of the upgrade and which party or parties would be responsible for those costs. In February 2023, the Federal Energy Regulatory Commission ordered NextEra Energy Resources to proceed with upgrades to the main generator breaker, which is expected to occur during the fall 2024 refueling outage.

== Relicensing ==
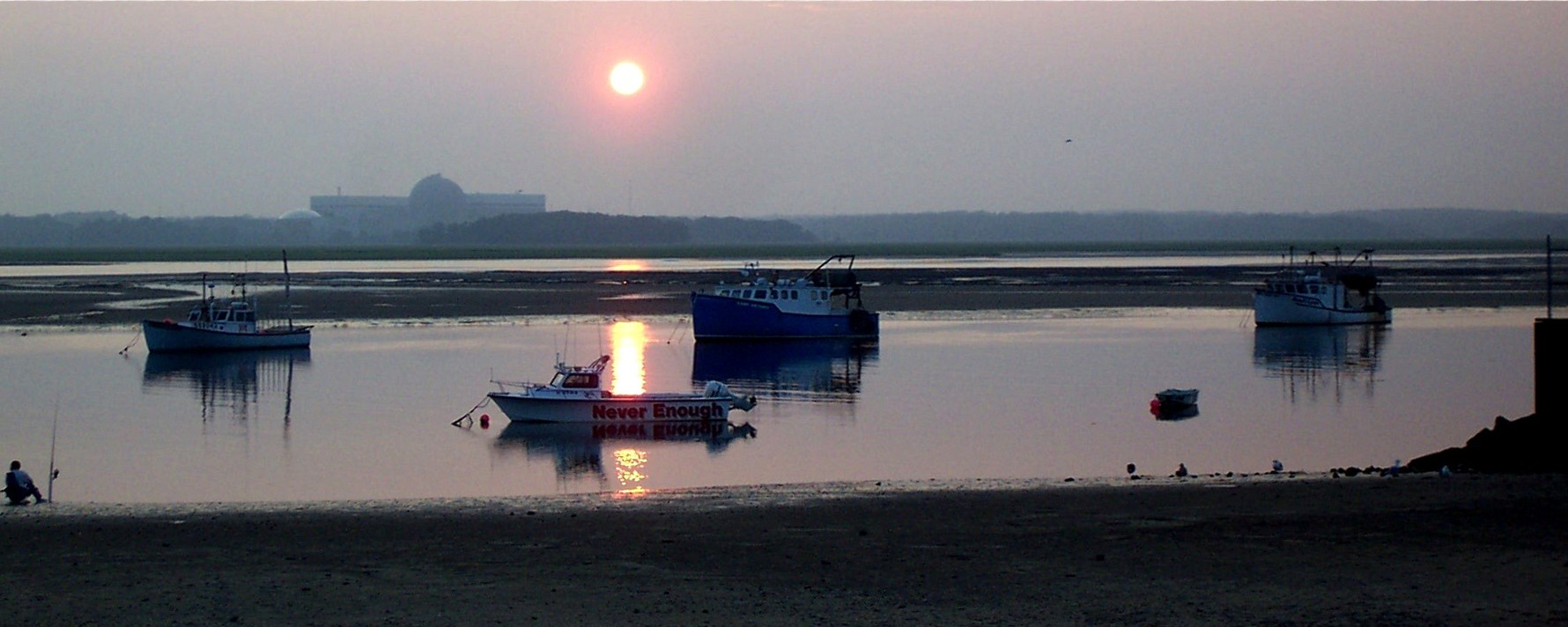
Seabrook Station behind the Blackwater River seen from Route 1A in Seabrook, New Hampshire

In 2010, Seabrook Station applied to have its operating license extended from 2030 to 2050. In September 2012, Massachusetts Reps. Edward Markey and John F. Tierney filed H.R. 6554, titled the "Nuclear Reactor Safety First Act", which would have prevented nuclear plants from receiving license extensions from the Nuclear Regulatory Commission (NRC) if they applied more than 10 years before their licenses expired. The legislation was specifically aimed at Seabrook Station's license extension, but the bill never proceeded out of House Committee.

During the relicensing process, there were safety concerns pertaining to concrete degradation at the plant due to alkali–silica reaction (ASR) because of ground-water infiltration into various structure foundations, which prompted concerns from various local politicians. In June 2017, NRC officials "reviewed numerous documents and inspected the plant as it gauge[d] NextEra's safety plan to monitor and manage the alkali-silica reaction phenomenon present in concrete throughout the power plant". In October 2017, federal regulators allowed the non-profit nuclear watchdog group C-10 to weigh in on the license amendment request.

On March 12, 2019, the NRC announced it would be renewing the operating license of Seabrook Station for an additional 20 years, expiring on March 15, 2050. Following the license extension announcement, the group C-10 filed an emergency petition to the NRC in an attempt to prevent any license extension until further hearings on ASR were held, which was denied by the NRC in July 2019. In August 2020, the NRC's Atomic Safety and Licensing Board (ASLB) formally accepted Seabrook Station's concrete monitoring program for ASR concerns. However, additional monitoring conditions were imposed by the Board in the plant's license, citing that they are "necessary to provide adequate protection of public health and safety".

In May 2021, U.S. Senators Elizabeth Warren and Ed Markey, both from Massachusetts, sent a letter to the NRC expressing concerns with the ASLB's decision and that the NRC should "reopen the record for consideration of supplemental testimony and strengthen the four license conditions in the ASLB’s Initial Decision."

== Community impact ==
In 2013, the Nuclear Energy Institute released a study showing the positive impact of Seabrook Station on the economy and environment. Key findings are listed below.

- Seabrook Station directly employs 650 people who earn, on average, more than double the average salary of workers in Rockingham County and Strafford County
- Seabrook Station generates approximately 40 percent of New Hampshire's total electricity, and its emission-free operation helps avoid the emission of nearly 4 million tons of carbon dioxide annually, which is the equivalent of taking almost 700,000 cars off the road
- Seabrook Station contributes $535 million of economic activity locally and contributes $1.4 billion to the U.S. economy each year, and for every dollar of output from Seabrook Station, the local economy produced $1.34
- Seabrook Station's financial contributions to local environmental groups over the previous decade amounted to more than $1 million

Seabrook Station has been cited as crucial for allowing Massachusetts to comply with carbon emission legal requirements, which was also evidenced by the closure of Vermont Yankee Nuclear Power Plant in 2015 causing carbon emissions to rise in New England for the first time in five years. According to projections by ISO New England, any decrease in electricity production in the region would not be expected to be replaced by renewable energy and instead would be replaced by natural gas. According to 2011 projections, if a gas-fired power plant had been built instead of Seabrook Station, then "it would have emitted nearly 94 million metric tons of CO2 over 22 years – nearly equal to all of Arizona's CO2 emissions for the whole of 2009". As of 2020, municipal electric utilities in Massachusetts only produced 2.43% of their energy from wind and solar energy, but because of contracts held with Seabrook Nuclear Station and Millstone Nuclear Power Plant in Connecticut, the share of non-emitting energy produced by Massachusetts municipal electric utilities jumps to 38.22%.

In April 2018, the New Hampshire Office of Strategic Initiatives released the state's 10-year state energy strategy that cited "preserving Seabrook Station as a source of zero-carbon energy is the most realistic and cost-effective means of managing emissions in New Hampshire at scale". If the electricity generation of Seabrook Station were to be matched by wind or solar power, the required land "would need about 290 square miles of wind turbines or about 80 square miles of solar panels".

== Electricity production ==
Generation (MWh) of Seabrook Station Nuclear Power Plant
Year	Jan	Feb	Mar	Apr	May	Jun	Jul	Aug	Sep	Oct	Nov	Dec	Annual (Total)
2001	41,921	777,519	448,121	832,051	839,779	834,215	861,957	835,010	834,916	723,475	801,877	861,902	8,692,743
2002	861,532	778,337	861,664	833,602	74,714	775,728	860,831	859,337	832,281	861,835	833,121	861,635	9,294,617
2003	861,034	777,401	861,171	832,708	862,309	834,673	862,222	861,602	820,133	124,682	715,873	862,480	9,276,288
2004	861,327	805,718	862,022	833,556	862,936	835,415	861,348	862,421	833,696	862,527	833,935	862,672	10,177,573
2005	862,341	779,160	778,883	0	768,661	877,645	906,870	906,912	878,860	909,792	878,871	907,890	9,455,885
2006	907,440	819,423	907,933	877,444	908,907	879,308	909,271	900,773	773,949	0	587,972	925,436	9,397,856
2007	877,980	836,094	871,034	856,511	927,331	897,115	926,577	925,890	896,620	925,105	897,572	926,055	10,763,884
2008	567,522	840,007	922,125	0	667,538	856,165	927,107	925,640	896,541	926,492	895,088	926,089	9,350,314
2009	924,993	836,579	925,103	896,458	926,038	896,326	926,131	926,113	892,480	0	340,343	326,109	8,816,673
2010	927,742	837,938	926,131	898,144	928,582	898,222	927,501	925,652	894,276	926,149	892,658	927,060	10,910,055
2011	927,234	814,532	923,218	0	218,028	863,528	927,644	925,774	895,657	230,977	898,957	737,258	8,362,807
2012	686,107	736,148	782,071	698,730	785,079	758,859	782,130	786,418	351,833	17,280	888,147	916,379	8,189,181
2013	928,572	838,463	927,730	898,799	928,720	897,851	926,855	927,947	896,959	926,972	899,554	928,303	10,926,725
2014	927,753	838,349	924,168	145,911	928,290	898,153	928,334	926,279	896,814	927,169	899,018	928,027	10,168,265
2015	927,399	837,795	926,963	898,491	928,074	897,051	926,131	926,225	822,759	139	464,155	929,022	9,484,204
2016	873,846	869,998	773,858	901,301	931,020	899,774	928,958	926,246	897,061	928,360	900,912	929,829	10,761,163
2017	930,333	840,397	925,581	1	874,245	900,838	929,978	930,294	897,300	929,471	902,100	930,166	9,990,704
2018	930,613	840,633	929,256	900,810	931,139	900,493	929,824	927,694	881,873	62,127	899,007	928,227	10,061,696
2019	927,928	837,893	927,070	899,150	928,832	898,058	927,354	926,201	894,269	926,621	885,497	928,050	10,906,923
2020	928,053	868,306	917,653	56,214	855,391	732,887	927,487	926,703	896,511	928,340	899,423	928,228	9,865,196
2021	927,671	838,377	927,417	899,157	928,624	898,816	926,509	925,835	895,720	26,952	732,471	928,568	9,856,117
2022	928,237	838,502	926,877	898,677	929,014	897,880	927,660	922,448	896,600	927,418	899,985	928,230	10,921,528
2023	928,464	837,889	924,540	2	628,777	898,790	888,108	778,916	896,929	928,520	895,304	928,542	9,534,781
2024	928,657	868,789	927,403	899,602	904,962	899,488	928,222	925,881	896,859	115,441	515,760	865,798	9,676,862
2025	927,147	829,174	926,259	897,963	927,628	898,308	928,323	926,953	895,358	926,942	898,872	927,238	10,910,165
2026	927,002	837,445	924,710	86,102	712,595	890,680	928,236	926,850					--

== Noteworthy events ==
In 1998, a plant electrician was laid off shortly after raising a safety concern with a system wiring configuration. The Nuclear Regulatory Commission (NRC) initiated an investigation into the matter, and determined that this action was a violation involving discrimination against an employee for raising a safety concern. This event resulted in an NRC Severity Level III violation and a $55,000 civil penalty.

In 2000, one of Seabrook Station's two emergency diesel generators failed during a surveillance test. The NRC inspection report detailed the event as follows:

The failure involved the crankcase overpressurizing, resulting in lifting of the crankcase relief cover assemblies, as well as displacement of the crankcase exhauster hose. Subsequent inspection revealed damage to one of the pistons and its cylinder liner as a result of non-uniform thermal growth of the aluminum piston skirt. That growth caused scuffing, scoring, and transfer of aluminum material from the piston skirt to the cylinder liner. The heat generated by the friction (galling) between the skirt and the liner bore, coupled with the hot combustion gas blow-by, eventually ignited oil vapor in the crankcase.

The NRC determined that the above event was a White finding (an issue of low to moderate safety significance), which also "involved the failure to take adequate corrective actions to address degraded components associated with one of the two emergency diesel generators (EDG)".

In 2005, a security fence installed by a subcontracted engineering firm failed a NRC inspection and was declared inoperable, which resulted in a fine of $65,000 by the NRC since "both design of the system and testing procedures did not adhere to NRC guidelines".

In 2012, the southern Maine coast experienced a magnitude 4.0 earthquake during Seabrook Station's refueling outage. An "Unusual Event" emergency classification was declared, but there was no impact to the plant or disruption in refueling activities.

In 2013, Seabrook Station and the workers' union reached a last-minute contract agreement within hours of expiring that would have resulted in a lockout.

In 2014, a small electrical fire originating from an elevator motor resulted in the declaration of an "Unusual Event" emergency classification. There were no injuries, evacuations, or threat to public safety from the event.

In 2015, a Seabrook Station security guard had stuffed a rifle barrel with an ear plug and two rolled up pieces of paper, which was later found during rifle cleaning. The event prompted an NRC investigation, and the security guard was banned for three years from involvement in all NRC-licensed activities.

In 2018, a magnitude 2.7 earthquake occurred approximately 10 miles from Seabrook Station, but the earthquake did not trigger any emergency procedures or result in any signs of structural damage to the plant.

In mid-2020, Seabrook Station experienced two unplanned shutdowns due to a set of control rods unexpectedly inserting into the reactor core. In both cases, all safety systems responded appropriately with the reactor being safely shut down.

On the morning of July 12, 2022, nine of the plant's sirens were "inadvertently activated" within the plant's 10-mile emergency planning zone. The sirens within the Hampton Beach area called for the beach and surrounding beaches to be evacuated. The plant and New Hampshire and Massachusetts Emergency Management Administrations later confirmed the siren activation to be a false alarm caused by human error during routine silent testing of the plant's 121 sirens. The false alarm led to the closure of beaches in Hampton, Rye, and Seabrook.

== Public opposition ==
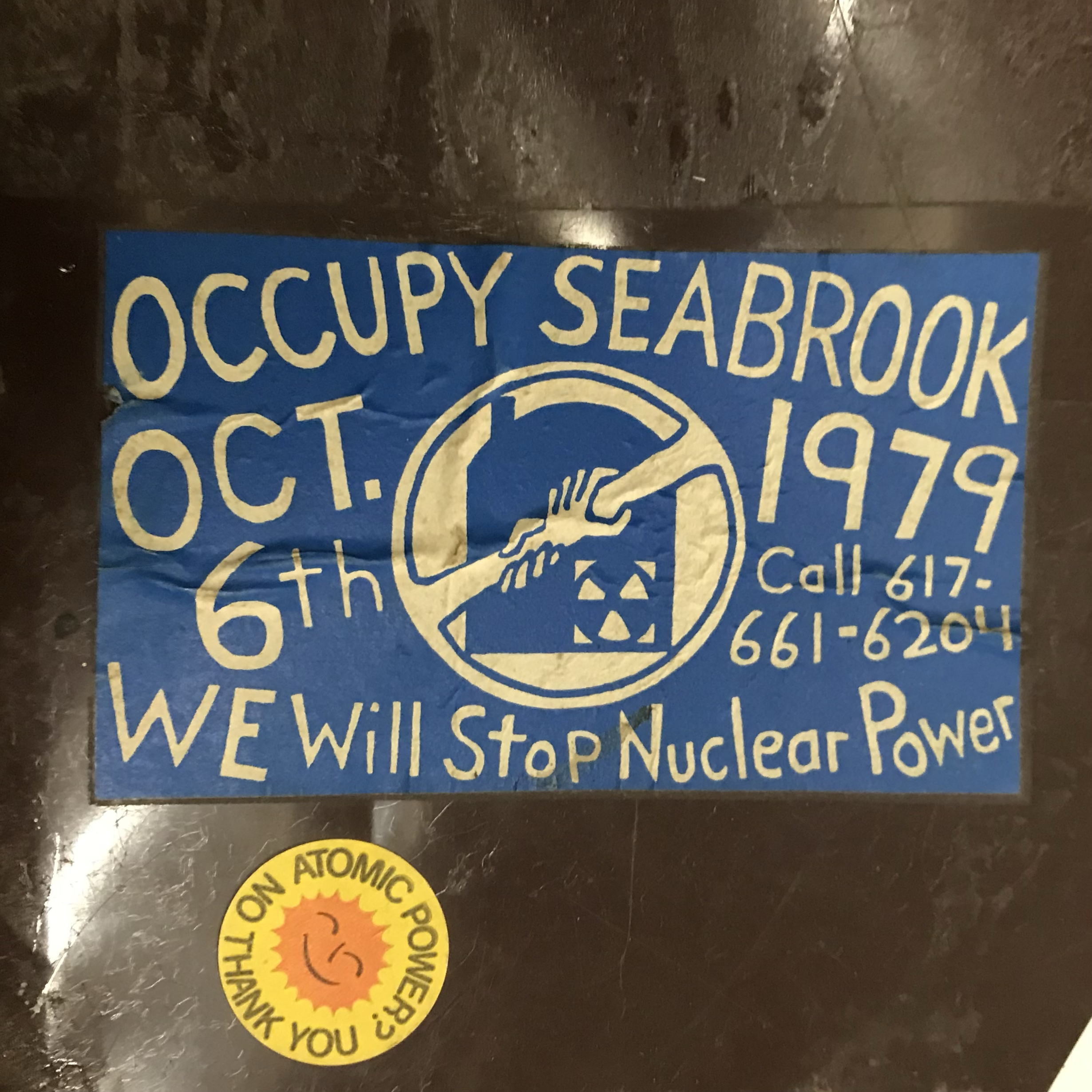
Occupy Seabrook, 1979

In 1975, the success of the anti-nuclear movement in Germany in cancelling construction of the Wyhl Nuclear Power Plant began to inspire attempted occupations of the construction site for Seabrook Station. Shortly thereafter in 1976, the Clamshell Alliance was formed after the Nuclear Regulatory Commission (NRC) issued Seabrook Station's construction permit.

On August 1, 1976, 600 protesters rallied at the Seabrook Station construction site. The following year in May 1977, more than 2,000 protesters occupied the construction site, of which "1,414 were arraigned on criminal trespass charges, one of the largest mass arrests in U.S. history". The Clamshell Alliance and its protests against the construction of Seabrook Station inspired other U.S. anti-nuclear groups to form including the Abalone Alliance protesting Diablo Canyon Power Plant. The Crabshell Alliance also protested Satsop Nuclear Power Plant.

However, construction of Seabrook Station continued, and many Clamshell Alliance activists became dispirited with reports of "massive burnout and dropout" following the 1977 occupation.

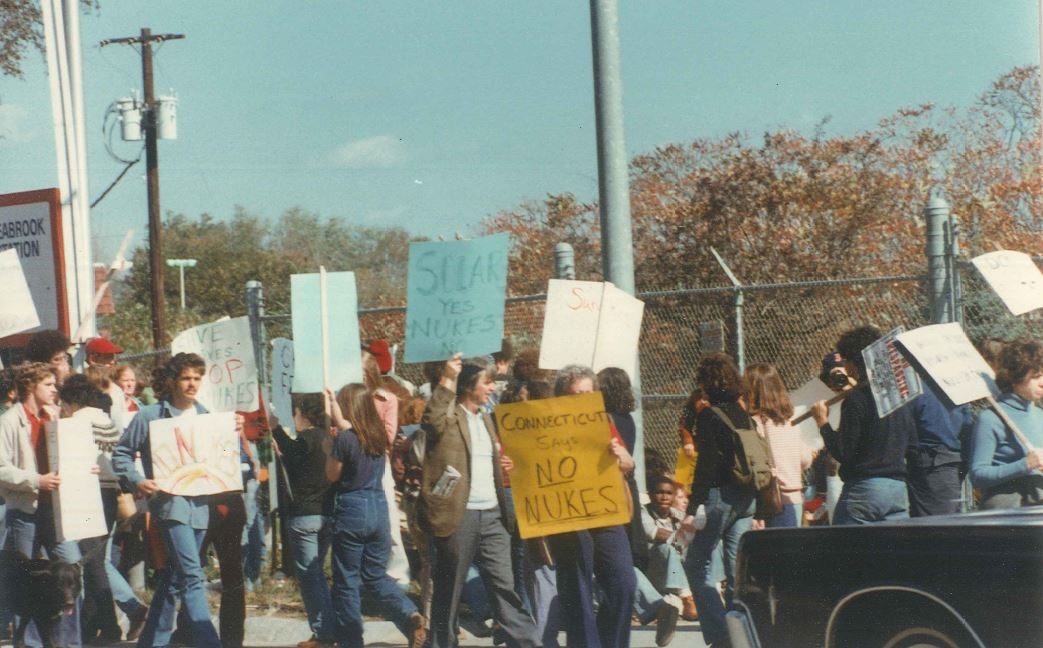
Protesters at Seabrook

In September 2017, activist Steve Comley Sr. along with his non-profit "We The People" paid for an electronic billboard in Salisbury, Massachusetts, allegedly warning of the absence of an evacuation plan in the event of an accident at Seabrook Station. In January 2018, the town of Merrimac, Massachusetts, joined half a dozen other communities "calling for the Nuclear Regulatory Commission to hold a hearing on whether the Seabrook, New Hampshire, nuclear power plant's evacuation plan can be effectively implemented". In response, NextEra Energy released the following statement:

We have extensive emergency response systems in place, including numerous back-up safety systems that provide our plants with layer upon layer of both automated and manual protection. Also, we work collaboratively with local, state and federal officials on a regular basis to ensure our plans are comprehensive and effective and continue to refine. These most recent claims by 'We the People' and Mr. Comley are completely without merit. Mr. Comley has a long history of making false allegations and baseless claims against Seabrook. Independent agencies, including the Nuclear Regulatory Commission, have reviewed his claims and allegations and have found them to be without substance.

== Accident analysis ==
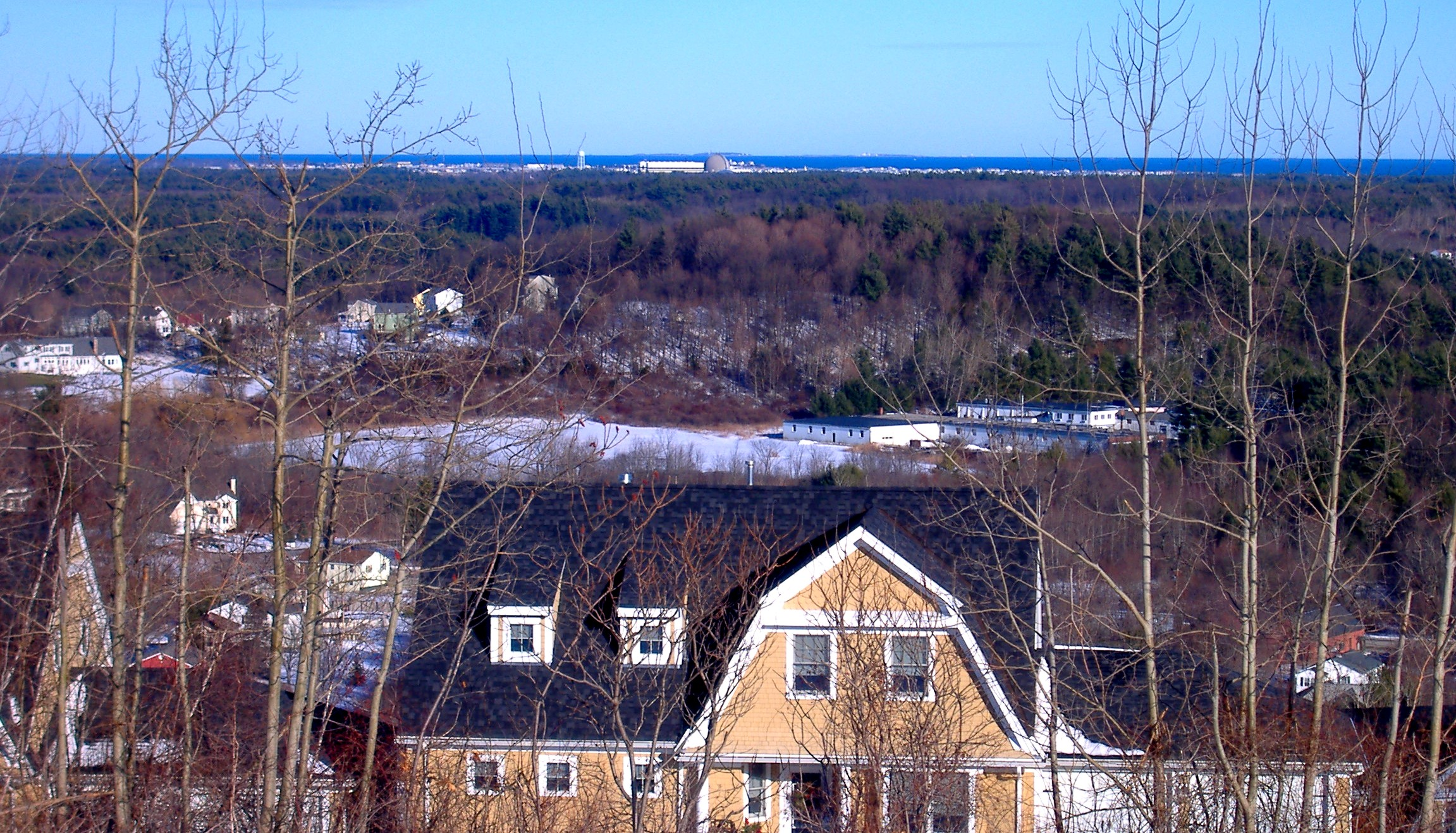
Seabrook Station seen from Powow Hill in nearby Amesbury, Massachusetts

The Nuclear Regulatory Commission defines two emergency planning zones around nuclear power plants: a plume exposure pathway zone with a radius of 10 miles (16 km), concerned primarily with exposure to, and inhalation of, airborne radioactive contamination, and an ingestion pathway zone of about 50 miles (80 km), concerned primarily with ingestion of food and liquid contaminated by radioactivity. The 2010 U.S. population within 10 miles (16 km) of Seabrook was 118,747, an increase of 10.1 percent in a decade. The 2010 U.S. population within 50 miles (80 km) was 4,315,571, an increase of 8.7 percent since 2000. Cities within 50 miles include Boston (40 miles to city center).

The Nuclear Regulatory Commission's estimate of the risk each year of an earthquake intense enough to cause core damage to the reactor at Seabrook was 1 in 45,455, according to an NRC study published in August 2010.

== See also ==
- Seabrook 1977 – a 1978 documentary about the protests against the plant's construction
