= Blackwater River (Massachusetts–New Hampshire) =

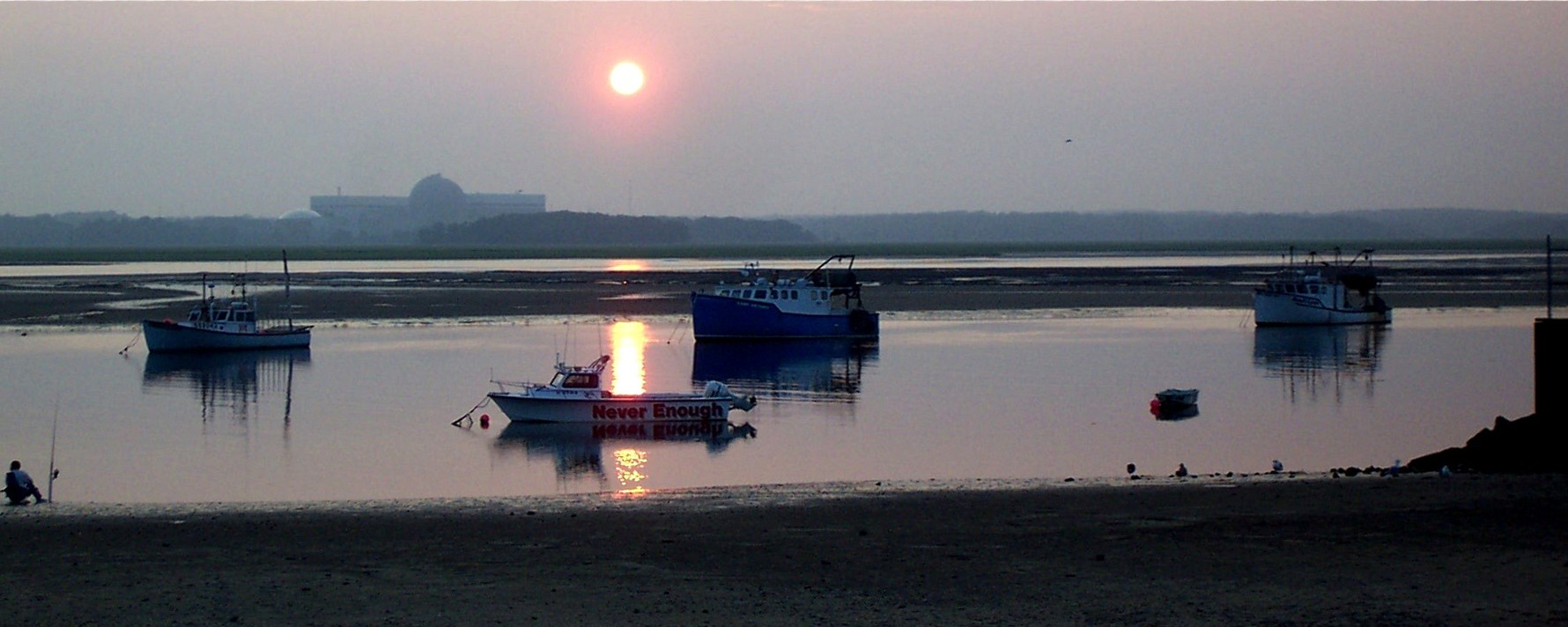
- The Seabrook Nuclear Power Station, as seen across the Blackwater River in Seabrook

- Location within New Hampshire Location within Massachusetts Location within the United States

Location
- Country: United States
- States: Massachusetts, New Hampshire
- Counties: Essex County, MA; Rockingham County, NH
- Towns: Salisbury, MA; Seabrook, NH

Physical characteristics
- Source
  - location: Salisbury, MA
  - coordinates: 42°52′0″N 70°49′22″W
  - elevation: 0 ft (0 m)
- Mouth: Hampton Harbor
  - location: Seabrook, NH
  - coordinates: 42°53′20″N 70°49′38″W
  - elevation: 0 ft (0 m)
- Length: 3.1 mi (5.0 km)

The Blackwater River is a 3.1-mile-long (5.0 km) tidal inlet in northeastern Massachusetts and southeastern New Hampshire in the United States.

The river forms in a salt marsh in the northeastern corner of Salisbury, Massachusetts, by the convergence of the Little River and Dead Creek. Heading north, the river quickly enters Seabrook, New Hampshire and continues to flow through salt marsh until it reaches Hampton Harbor, northwest of Seabrook Beach, where it joins the Hampton River.

== See also ==
- List of rivers of Massachusetts
- List of rivers of New Hampshire
