= Hampton Bridge =

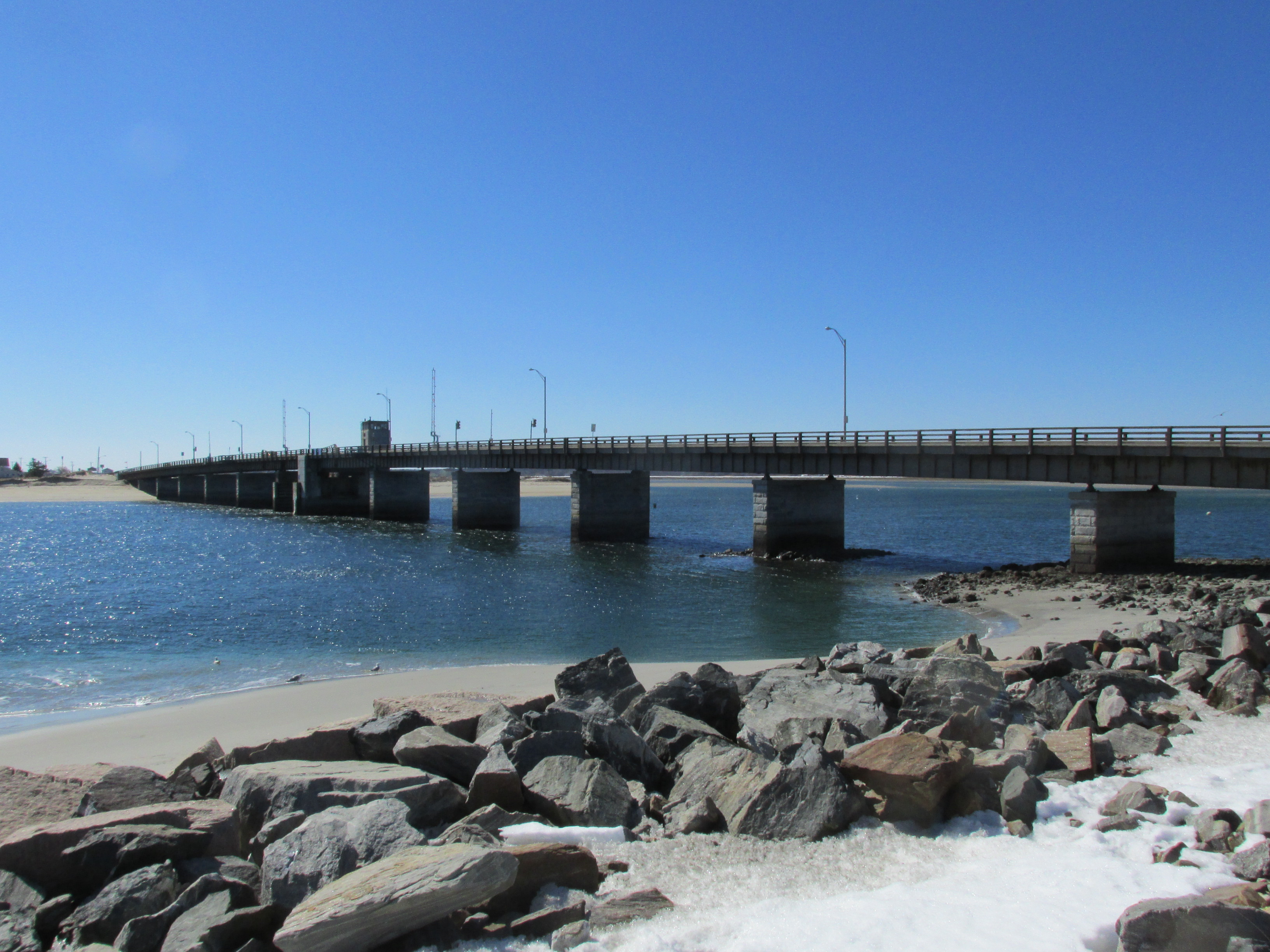
- Current bridge
- Coordinates: 42°53′46″N 70°48′59″W
- Carries: NH 1A
- Crosses: Hampton Harbor Inlet
- Locale: Hampton Beach, NH
- Official name: Neil R. Underwood Memorial Bridge

Characteristics
- Design: Girder bridge with bascule bridge span
- Material: Steel and concrete

History
- Opened: December 15, 1949; 76 years ago
- Replaces: Mile-Long Wooden Bridge

Location
- Interactive map of Hampton Bridge

The Hampton Bridge is a bascule bridge that spans the Hampton River near Hampton Beach, New Hampshire, United States. Constructed with steel and concrete, the bridge is officially named for Neil R. Underwood. Its predecessor was constructed of wood by Wallace D. Lovell and was referred to as the Mile-Long Wooden Bridge. For a time in the early 1900s, Hampton Bridge earned the title of longest bridge in the United States.

The completion of the old bridge took almost a year and according to the Exeter Newsletter of July 5, 1901, was a "great undertaking". Long hours of manpower went into moving materials and building it. The bridge measured 4,740 feet (1,440 m) in length and 30 feet (9.1 m) in width. It was supported by 3,865 wooden piles driven deep into the bottom of the river. Moving the materials used to build the bridge presented a great challenge. A tugboat named the H.A. Mathes towed rafts full of lumber to the bridge site from Portsmouth. "Other materials were floated downstream to the bridge from the railroad station at Hampton Falls."

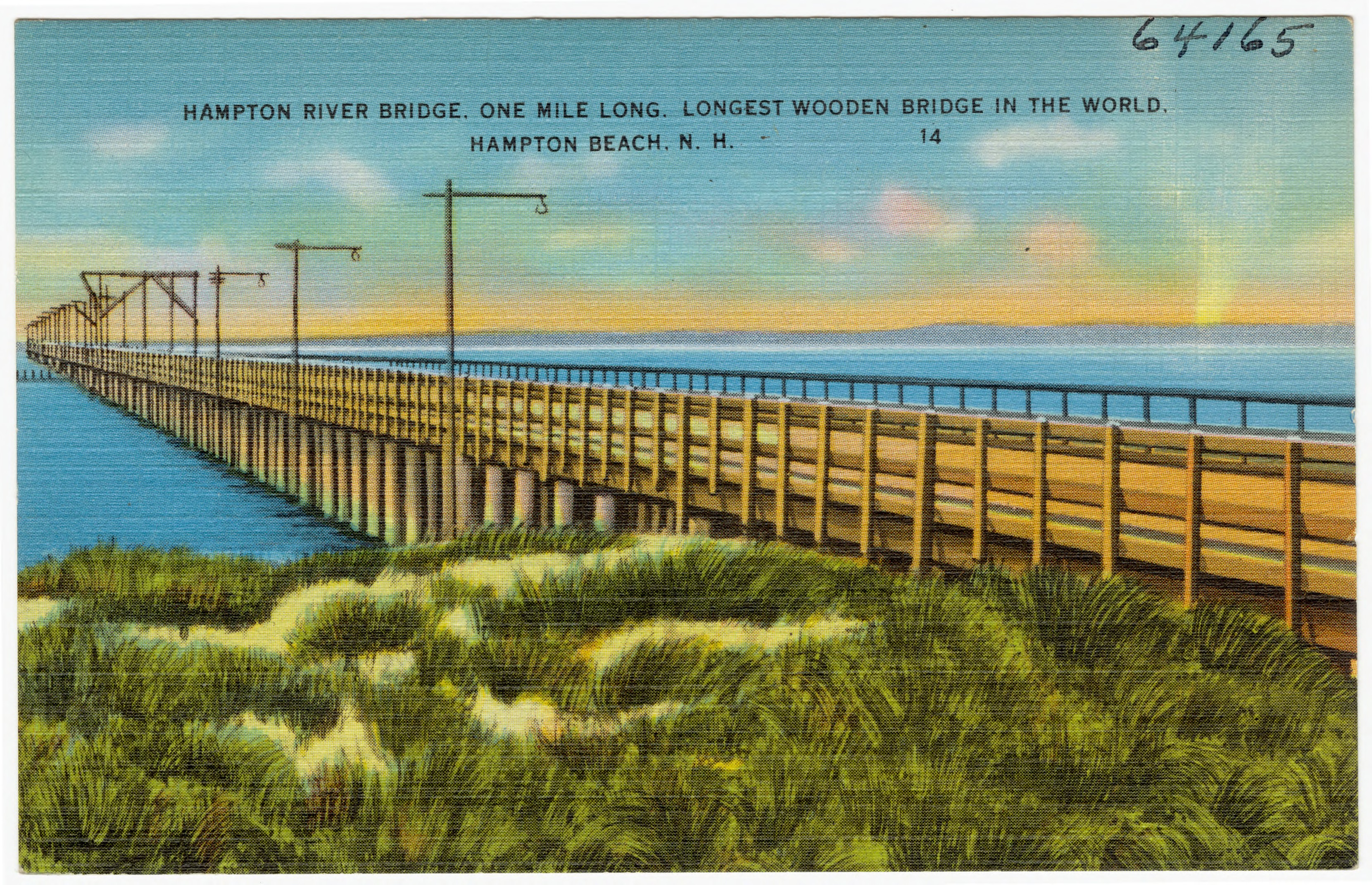
Postcard of "longest wooden bridge in the world"

The official opening of the "Mile-long Bridge" was May 14, 1901. Chester B. Jordan, the governor at the time, was among many political figures who attended the opening. As the end of the era of trolley cars rolled in, automobiles took over and the wooden bridge was not effective anymore. Lovell sold the bridge to the Eastern Massachusetts Street Railway. "By 1930, the structure began to show the strain of the years of shifting sands, ice floes and heavy traffic." New Hampshire was faced with making plans for a modernized structure to replace the wooden bridge. The current bridge opened on December 15, 1949.
