= Seabrook, New Hampshire =

- Town
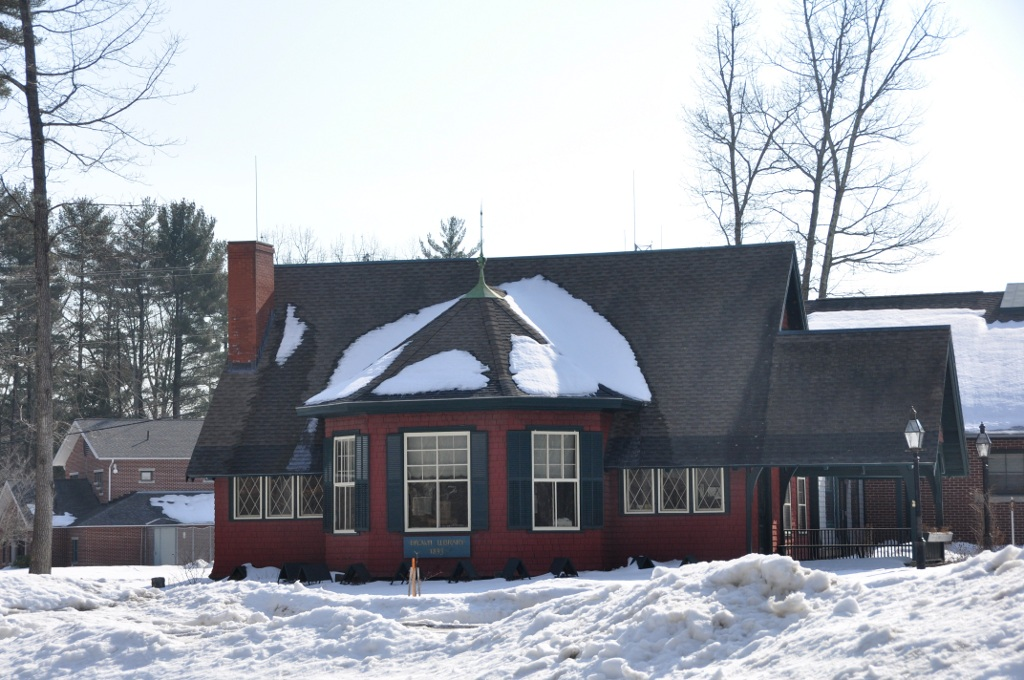
- The public library, old portion

- Seal

- Location in Rockingham County and the state of New Hampshire.
- Coordinates: 42°53′42″N 70°52′16″W
- Country: United States
- State: New Hampshire
- County: Rockingham
- Incorporated: June 3, 1768
- Villages: Seabrook; Seabrook Beach; Seabrook Station; Smithtown; South Seabrook; Weare Corner

Area
  - Total: 9.70 sq mi (25.13 km^{2})
  - Land: 8.98 sq mi (23.25 km^{2})
  - Water: 0.73 sq mi (1.88 km^{2}) 7.46%
- Elevation: 36 ft (11 m)

Population (2020)
  - Total: 8,401
  - Density: 936/sq mi (361.3/km^{2})
- Time zone: UTC-5 (Eastern)
  - Summer (DST): UTC-4 (Eastern)
- ZIP code: 03874
- Area code: 603
- FIPS code: 33-68260
- GNIS feature ID: 873718
- Website: www.seabrooknh.info

Seabrook is a town in Rockingham County, New Hampshire, United States. The population was 8,401 at the 2020 census. Located at the southern end of the coast of New Hampshire, on the border with Massachusetts, Seabrook is noted as the location of the Seabrook Station Nuclear Power Plant, the third-most recently constructed nuclear power plant in the United States.

Seabrook is the first town one encounters when entering New Hampshire northbound on I–95.

== Geography ==
According to the United States Census Bureau, the town has a total area of 9.7 square miles (25.1 km^{2}), of which 9.0 square miles (23.3 km^{2}) are land and 0.73 square miles (1.9 km^{2}) are water, comprising 7.46% of the town. The census-designated place of Seabrook Beach occupies the eastern end of the town, along the Atlantic Ocean. The highest point in Seabrook is 217 feet (66 m) above sea level on Grape Hill, whose 230-foot (70 m) summit lies just south of the town line in Salisbury, Massachusetts. Seabrook is drained by the Blackwater, the Browns River, and the Hampton Falls River, all of which drain north or east to Hampton Harbor, an inlet to the Atlantic Ocean. The southwestern corner of the town drains via Lucy Brook to the Back River in Massachusetts, part of the Merrimack River watershed.

=== Adjacent municipalities ===
- Hampton Falls (north)
- Hampton (northeast)
- Salisbury, Massachusetts (south)
- Amesbury, Massachusetts (southwest at one point)
- South Hampton (west)
- Kensington (northwest)

== Demographics ==
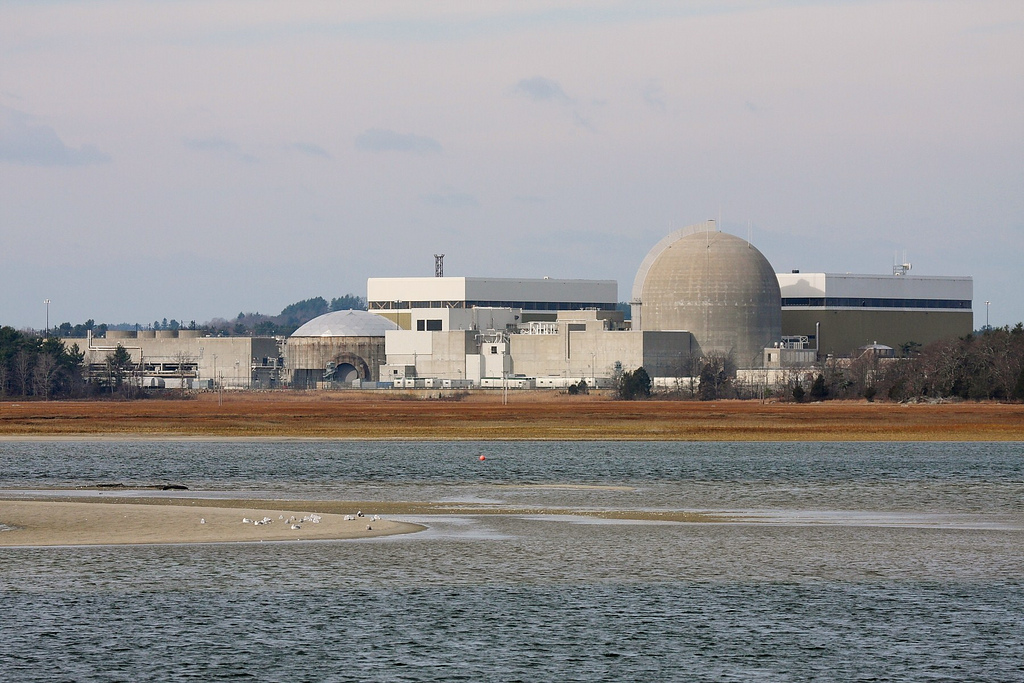
Seabrook Station nuclear power plant

Historical population
| Census | Pop. | Note | %± |
|---|---|---|---|
| 1790 | 715 | | — |
| 1800 | 628 | | −12.2% |
| 1810 | 774 | | 23.2% |
| 1820 | 885 | | 14.3% |
| 1830 | 1,096 | | 23.8% |
| 1840 | 1,392 | | 27.0% |
| 1850 | 1,266 | | −9.1% |
| 1860 | 1,549 | | 22.4% |
| 1870 | 1,609 | | 3.9% |
| 1880 | 1,745 | | 8.5% |
| 1890 | 1,672 | | −4.2% |
| 1900 | 1,497 | | −10.5% |
| 1910 | 1,425 | | −4.8% |
| 1920 | 1,537 | | 7.9% |
| 1930 | 1,666 | | 8.4% |
| 1940 | 1,782 | | 7.0% |
| 1950 | 1,788 | | 0.3% |
| 1960 | 2,209 | | 23.5% |
| 1970 | 3,053 | | 38.2% |
| 1980 | 5,917 | | 93.8% |
| 1990 | 6,503 | | 9.9% |
| 2000 | 7,934 | | 22.0% |
| 2010 | 8,693 | | 9.6% |
| 2020 | 8,401 | | −3.4% |
U.S. Decennial Census

As of the 2010 census, there were 8,693 people, 3,706 households and 2,276 families living in the town. The population density was 977 inhabitants per square mile (377/km^{2}). There were 4,544 housing units in the town, 838 of which (18.4%) were vacant. 512 of the vacant units were for seasonal or recreational use. The racial makeup of the town was 96.3% White, 0.5% African American, 0.1% Native American, 1.1% Asian, 0.6% some other race, and 1.4% from two or more races. Hispanic or Latino of any race were 1.4% of the population.

Of the 3,706 households in the town, 25.4% had children under the age of 18 living with them, 45.0% were headed by married couples living together, 11.1% had a female householder with no husband present, and 38.6% were non-families. 30.1% of all households were made up of individuals, and 11.7% were someone living alone who was 65 years of age or older. The average household size was 2.34, and the average family size was 2.90.

The town's age distribution was 18.7% under the age of 18, 7.8% from 18 to 24, 24.2% from 25 to 44, 31.7% from 45 to 64, and 17.5% who were 65 years of age or older. The median age was 44.6 years. For every 100 females, there were 99.0 males. For every 100 females age 18 and over, there were 98.4 males.

For the period 2014–2018, the estimated median household income was $67,430, and the median family income was $78,769. Male full-time workers had a median income of $53,315 versus $41,354 for females. The per capita income for the town was $35,356.

== Regional accent ==
The town of Seabrook has historically been known to have an accent unique to New England and even the surrounding towns, colloquially known as the "Brookah Accent". Sources have described the accent as reminiscent of rural England, particularly Yorkshire, accents. This is believed to have been influenced by the relationship between Seabrook and towns in Maine due to the shared fishing-based economy. Others have claimed that the accent originates from Elizabethan London through colonists entering America, which was preserved to an unusual extent in the town. This leads to the claim that the accent is particularly similar to Shakespearean English, which can be sparsely found in a few American states today.

== Sites of interest ==
- Seabrook Beach, a census-designated place
- Seabrook Greyhound Park, which ended live racing in 2009, and now operates as a casino-like facility under a different name
- Seabrook Station Nuclear Power Plant, in operation since 1990

== Fireworks ==
Due to its location along I-95 on the Massachusetts-New Hampshire border, Seabrook has many fireworks and fireworks supply stores; consumer fireworks are legal in New Hampshire, whereas in Massachusetts, they are illegal and cannot be purchased. This creates a demand for fireworks in border towns like Seabrook, to the point where Massachusetts State Police have entered New Hampshire in efforts to crack down on transport of fireworks back over the border.

== Notable people ==
- Alvah Augustus Eaton (1865–1908), botanist
- Pamela Gidley (1965–2018), actress
- Scotty Lago (born 1987), bronze medalist snowboarder (2010 Olympics)
- Jackson Nicoll (born 2003), child actor
- Meshech Weare (1713–1786), New Hampshire's first president (now known as governor)
