= Hampton Falls, New Hampshire =

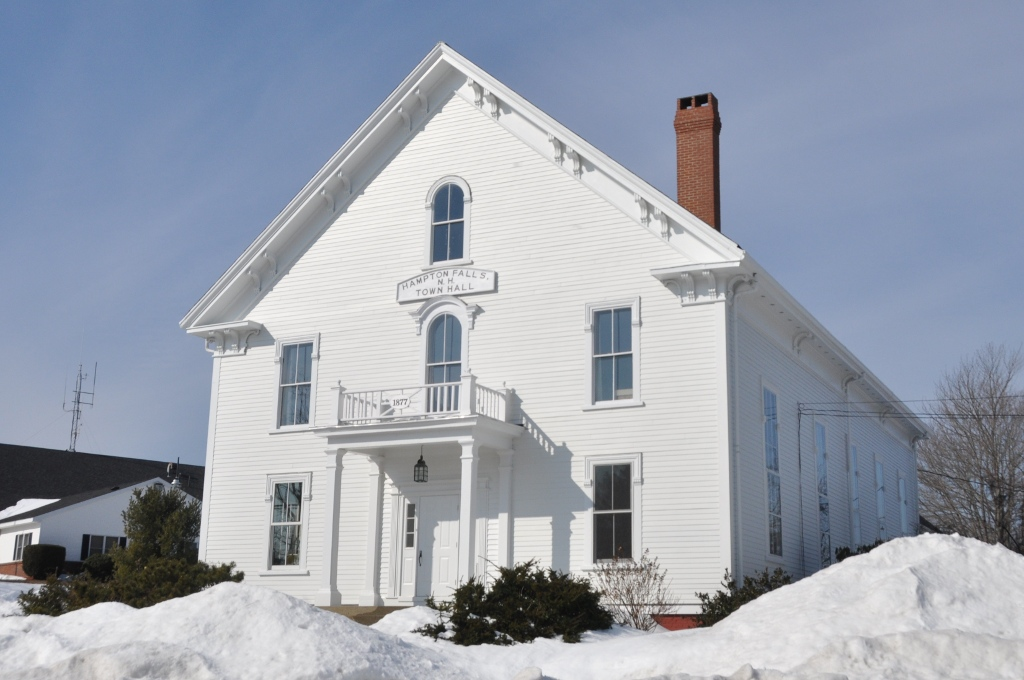
- Town Hall

- Seal

- Location in Rockingham County and the state of New Hampshire
- Coordinates: 42°55′08″N 70°52′12″W
- Country: United States
- State: New Hampshire
- County: Rockingham
- Incorporated: 1726

Area
  - Total: 12.7 sq mi (32.8 km^{2})
  - Land: 12.2 sq mi (31.7 km^{2})
  - Water: 0.42 sq mi (1.1 km^{2}) 3.39%
- Elevation: 30 ft (9.1 m)

Population (2020)
  - Total: 2,403
  - Density: 197/sq mi (75.9/km^{2})
- Time zone: UTC−5 (Eastern)
  - Summer (DST): UTC−4 (Eastern)
- ZIP Code: 03844
- Area code: 603
- FIPS code: 33-33460
- GNIS feature ID: 873617
- Website: www.hamptonfalls.org

Hampton Falls is a town in Rockingham County, New Hampshire, United States. The population was 2,403 at the 2020 census.

== History ==
Archaeological excavations have confirmed that what is now Hampton Falls has been occupied by humans for roughly 10,000 years. The first settlers were indigenous peoples of the Northeastern Woodlands.

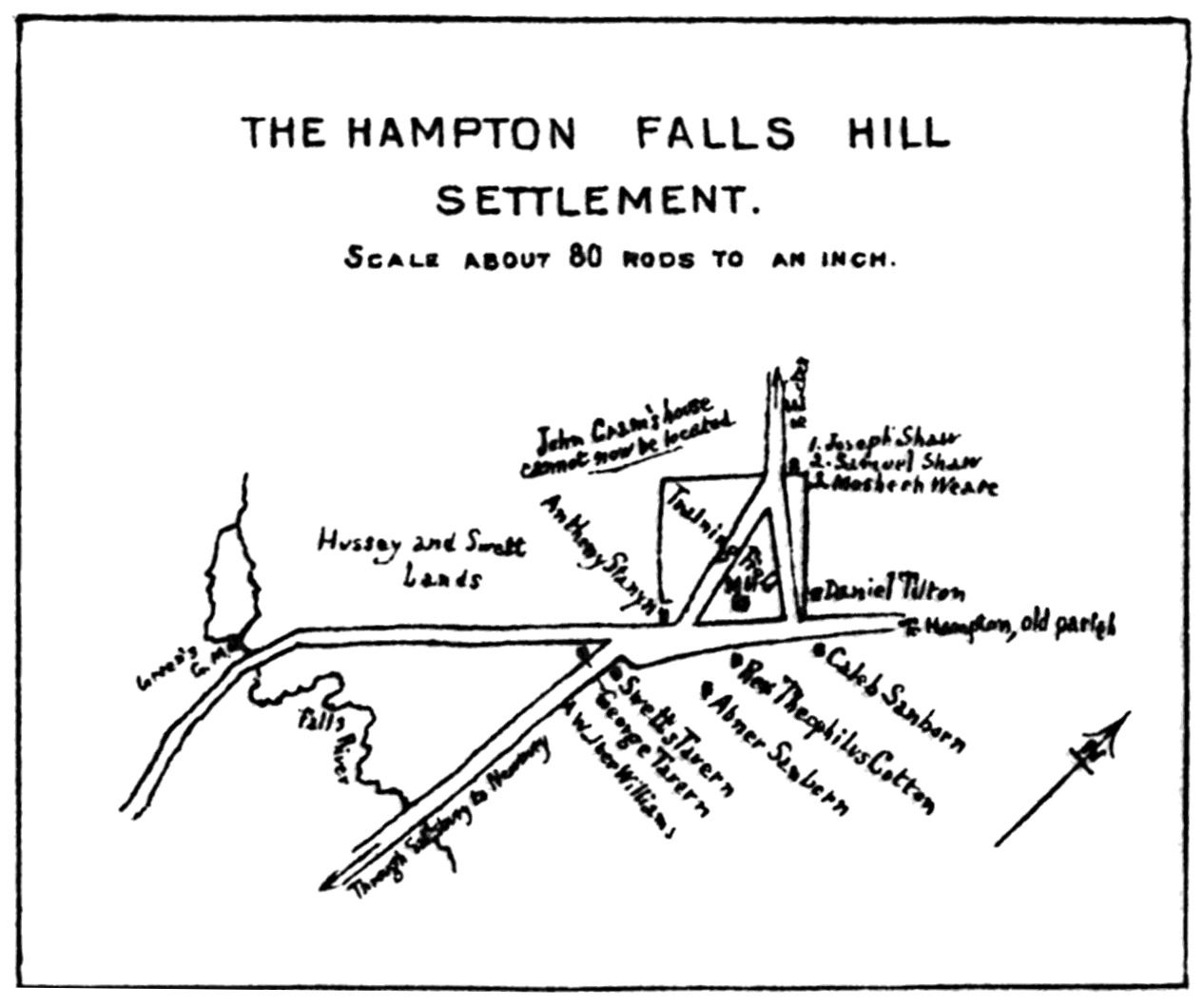
A map of the center of what is now Hampton Falls in 1638

The land of Hampton Falls was first settled by Europeans in 1638, the same time as Hampton, of which it was then a part. The settlement of Hampton joined Norfolk County, Massachusetts Colony, in 1643, along with Exeter, Dover, Portsmouth, Salisbury and Haverhill. The county existed until 1679, when the modern-day New Hampshire towns separated from the Massachusetts Bay Colony.

Records indicate a building that became a church may have existed near where the Weare Monument now is in 1665, but when it was first built is unknown. It was not until 1709 that the town was officially established as the Third Parish of Hampton. The Third Parish originally consisted of all land south of the Taylor River and north of the New Hampshire/Massachusetts border, or the modern-day towns of Seabrook, Kensington, and Hampton Falls.

A meeting house was built shortly after, and Thomas Crosby became the town's minister for the church. Forty-nine members of the Hampton Church were dismissed late in 1711, only to become members of the new church in the Third Parish. Parish officers and a representative were chosen in 1718. The first town meeting was held and town records began that year also. The 7,400-acre (30 km^{2}) town received its grant as an independent town with the name "Hampton falls" in 1726, but was still referred to as a parish until the Revolutionary War. Those who did use its actual name in writing spelled it with a lowercase f until around the same time.

An attempt was made in 1732 to separate the western portion of Hampton Falls and make it a parish of Kingston. The proposal failed in a way, yet succeeded in another; the land was separated, but it did not become part of Kingston—in 1737 it became a town of its own, Kensington.

A disease known as the "Throat Distemper" (now thought to have been a malignant form of diphtheria) infected the town with its symptoms in 1735 and 1736. 214 people of Hampton Falls perished, 96 of them being under the age of ten. Only two homes in town were throat distemper free. It passed through the town again in 1754, with far fewer casualties, but still many.

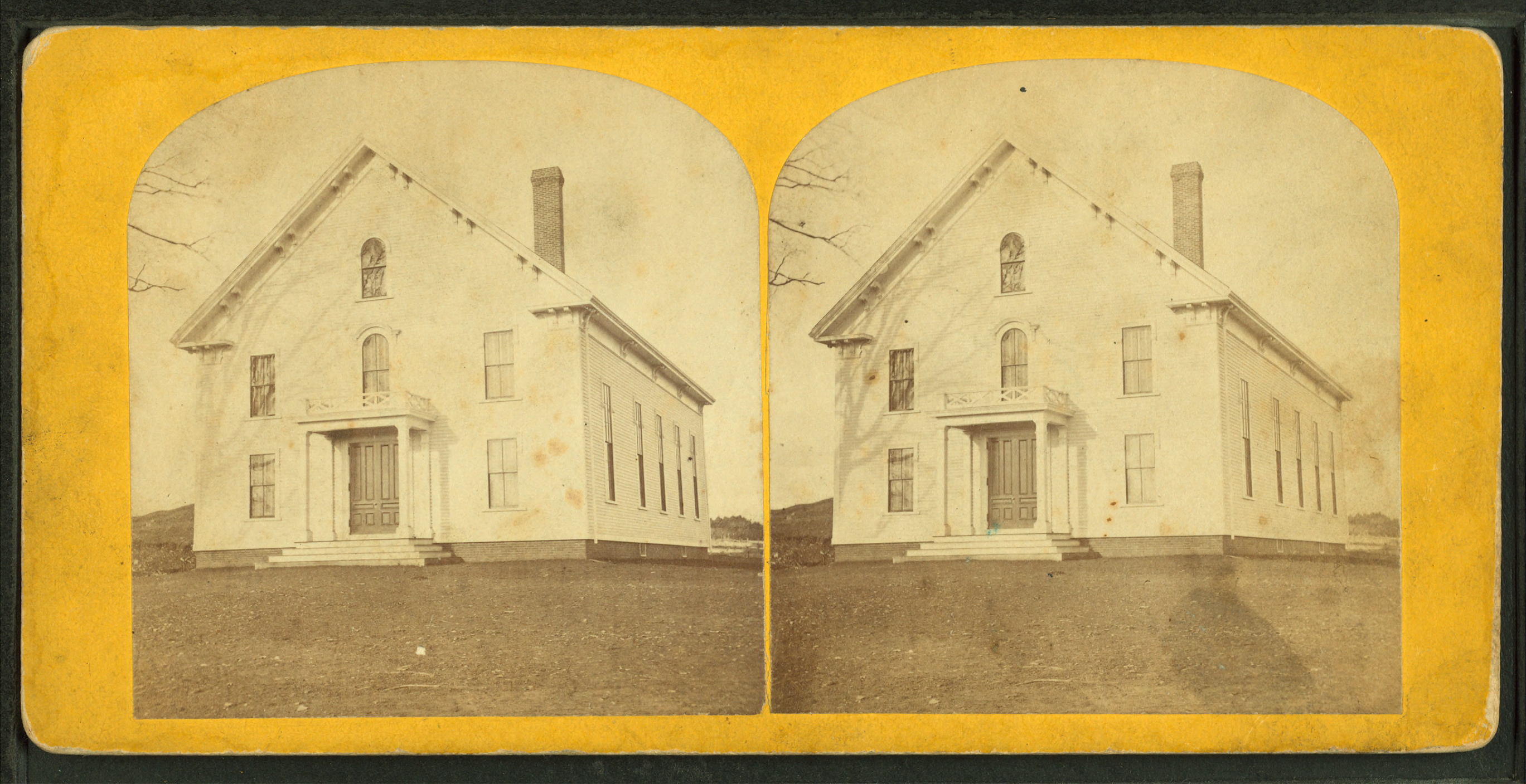
Town Hall, completed in 1877, designed by Portsmouth architect Isaiah Wilson

Seventy-two people wanted Hampton Falls (which then included Seabrook and Kensington) to become a part of Massachusetts in 1739, including Meshech Weare, but the proposal failed in the end. In 1765, the Presbyterians of the town wanted to form a new parish in the southern portion of the town, where a church of their religion existed. A town meeting was held on December 30 when the rest of the villagers learned of the Presbyterians' plans, and it was decided that the town would be separated into two. The new parish was formed in 1768, and became incorporated under the name Seabrook shortly after. Hampton Falls was considered one of the leading manufacturing towns in the entire state of New Hampshire around the time of 1770.

A plan to unite Seabrook and portions of Hampton Falls was proposed in 1782. The town would have been called "New Hampton Falls", but Hampton Falls was successful in making the proposal fail. In 1835, the town of Hampton Falls had a new meeting-house erected. Where in town it existed is unknown.

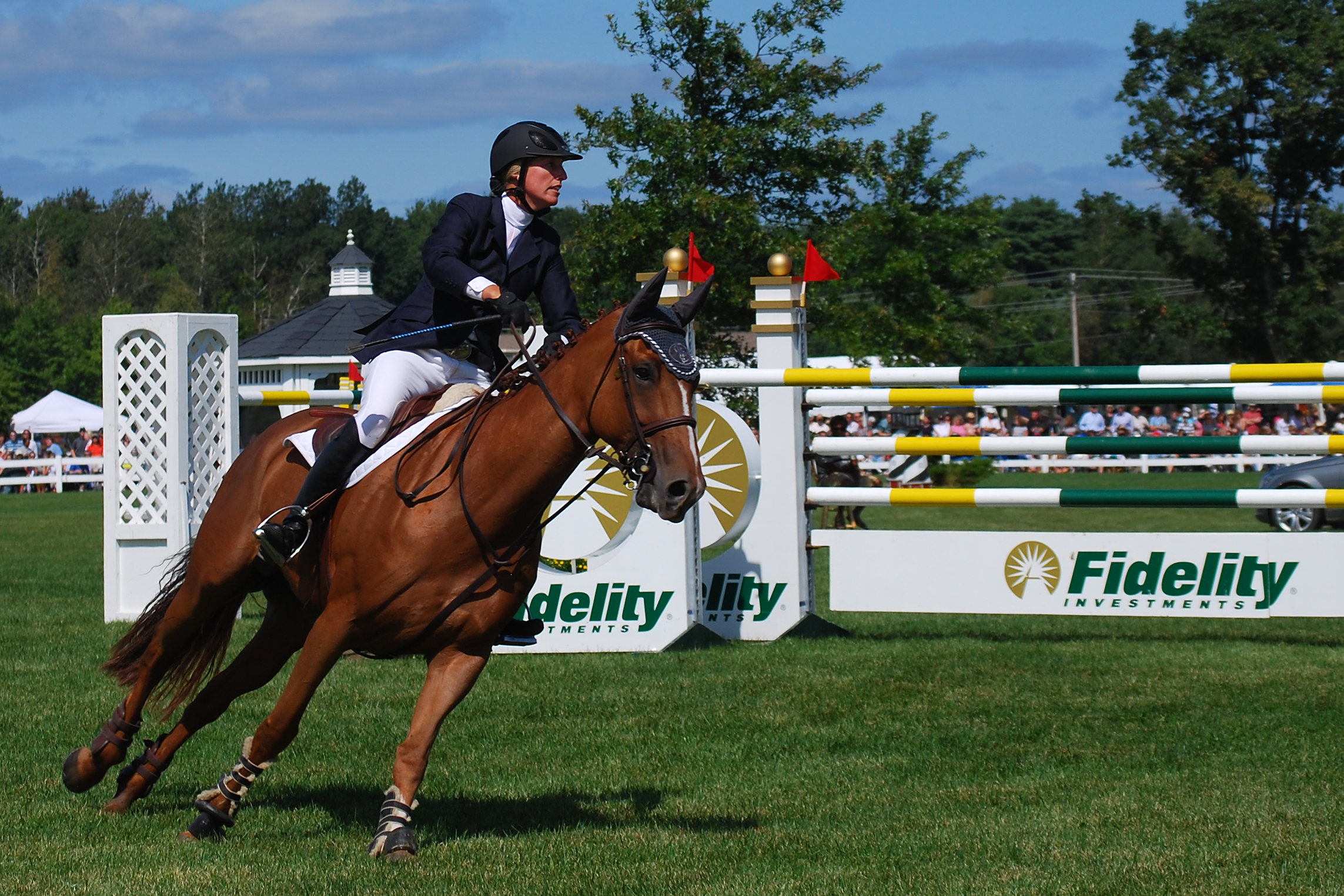
2008 Fidelity Jumper Classic, held at the Silver Oak Equestrian Center

On the night between October 29 and 30 in 1827, an earthquake struck the small town. A flash of light from a fault in the southern region of the town occurred, with violent trembling shortly following. It caused at least three chimneys to collapse partially or completely, with several others cracked. A more severe earthquake had struck Hampton Falls on November 18, 1755.

On May 21, 2006, an F2 tornado formed in the town at around 6:30 p.m. EST. It was near Interstate 95 where it overturned a truck, leaving two injured men and a kayak in a tree.

== Geography ==
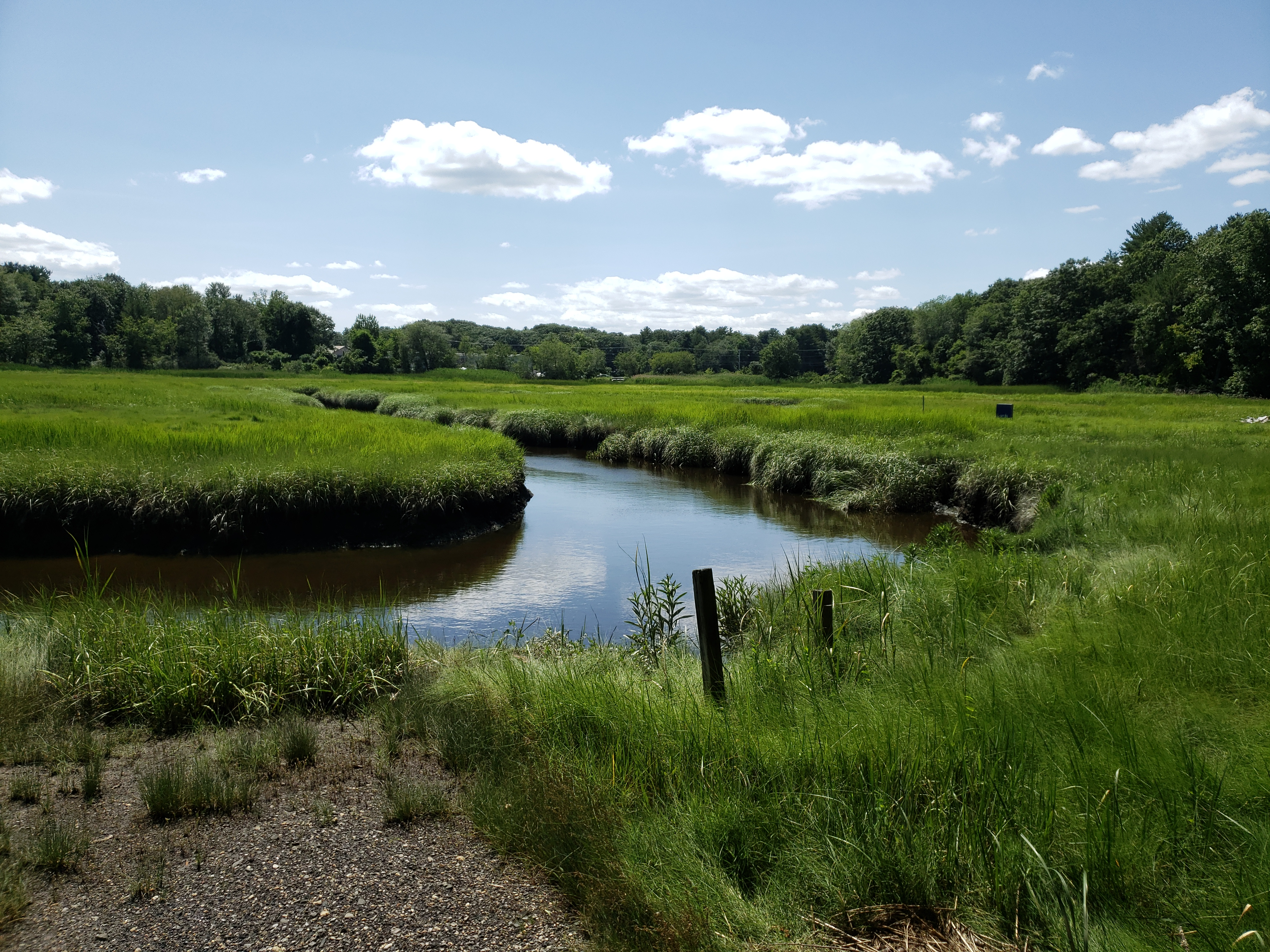
The Hampton Falls River running through the Hampton Falls portion of the Seabrook-Hamptons salt marsh

The city of Boston is 45 miles (72 km) to the south, and Portsmouth is 13 miles (21 km) to the north.

The highest point in town is the summit of Great Hill, at 246 feet (75 m) above sea level), just north of Weares Mill on the Hampton Falls River. According to the United States Census Bureau, the town has a total area of 12.7 square miles (32.8 km^{2}), of which 12.2 square miles (31.7 km^{2}) are land and 0.42 square miles (1.1 km^{2}) are water, comprising 3.39% of the town. The town is drained by the Hampton Falls and Taylor rivers and is part of the Hampton River watershed leading to the Atlantic Ocean via Hampton Harbor. Of roughly 4,400 acres (18 km^{2}) of salt marsh in the Seabrook-Hamptons Estuary, nearly 1,000 acres (4.0 km^{2}) lie within Hampton Falls.

The town is served by Interstate 95, U.S. Route 1, New Hampshire Route 84 and New Hampshire Route 88.

=== Adjacent municipalities ===
- Hampton (northeast)
- Seabrook (south)
- Kensington (west)
- Exeter (northwest)

== Demographics ==
Historical population
Census	Pop.	Note	%±
1790	541		—
1800	519		−4.1%
1810	570		9.8%
1820	572		0.4%
1830	582		1.7%
1840	656		12.7%
1850	640		−2.4%
1860	621		−3.0%
1870	679		9.3%
1880	678		−0.1%
1890	623		−8.1%
1900	560		−10.1%
1910	552		−1.4%
1920	483		−12.5%
1930	481		−0.4%
1940	493		2.5%
1950	629		27.6%
1960	885		40.7%
1970	1,254		41.7%
1980	1,372		9.4%
1990	1,467		6.9%
2000	1,890		28.8%
2010	2,236		18.3%
2020	2,403		7.5%

As of the census of 2000, there were 1,890 people, 704 households, and 546 families residing in the town. The population density was 153.9 inhabitants per square mile (59.4/km^{2}). There were 729 housing units at an average density of 59.7 per square mile (23.1/km^{2}). The racial makeup of the town was 98.46% White, 0.05% African American, 0.74% Asian, 0.05% from other races, and 0.69% from two or more races. Hispanic or Latino of any race were 0.69% of the population.

There were 704 households, out of which 34.7% had children under the age of 18 living with them, 70.5% were married couples living together, 5.1% had a female householder with no husband present, and 22.4% were non-families. Of all households, 16.5% were made up of individuals, and 7.8% had someone living alone who was 65 years of age or older. The average household size was 2.67 and the average family size was 3.03.

In the town, the population was spread out, with 25.7% under the age of 18, 4.0% from 18 to 24, 27.1% from 25 to 44, 30.4% from 45 to 64, and 12.8% who were 65 years of age or older. The median age was 42 years. For every 100 females, there were 102.8 males. For every 100 females age 18 and over, there were 96.3 males.

The median income for a household in the town was $76,348, and the median income for a family was $86,229. Males had a median income of $60,250 versus $36,750 for females. The per capita income for the town was $35,060. About 2.2% of families and 2.9% of the population were below the poverty line, including 3.1% of those under age 18 and 3.3% of those age 65 or over.

According to State figures, "Population in Hampton Falls tripled over the last fifty years, growing above the statewide average rate in three of the five decades. Decennial growth rates ranged from a nine percent increase between 1970–1980 to a 42 percent increase between 1960–1970. Population in Hampton Falls grew by a total of 1,251 residents, going from 629 in 1950 to 1,880 residents in 2000."

== Government ==
Like many New England towns, Hampton Falls has a town meeting/board of selectmen form of government. The current selectmen are Edward Beattie, Mark Lane, and Lou Gargiulo. Town meeting is held annually in the school auditorium, and elections are conducted using a New Hampshire Senate Bill 2 system.

Hampton Falls town presidential vote
Year	Democratic	Republican	Third parties
2020	49.1% 845	50.2% 863	0.7% 12
2016	42.9% 672	52.5% 822	4.6% 72
2012	36.7% 548	61.4% 917	2.1% 28
2008	40.3% 589	58.6% 856	1.0% 15

== Economy ==
Once a farming and lumbering community, the numerous falls on the Taylor River provided water power for mills operating within the town. Today it is largely residential, with numerous antique shops along U.S. 1. Applecrest Farm Orchards, established in 1913, is the town's largest employer, with 18 employees.

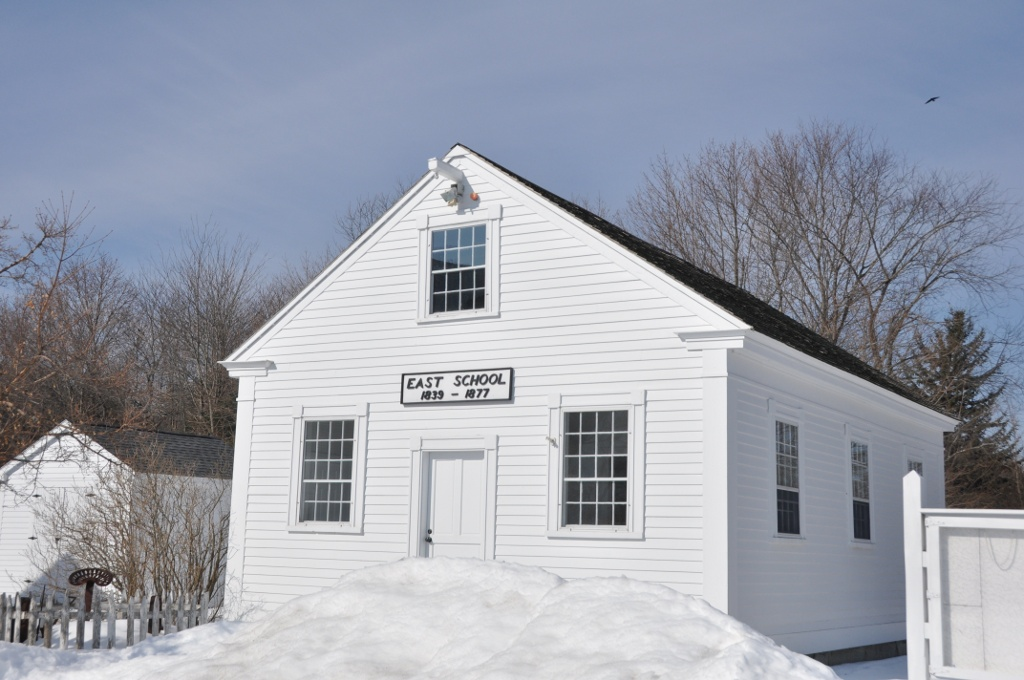
The old East School, adjacent to the public library

== Education ==
Currently, the Lincoln Akerman School is the only public school in town. But at one point, five public schools existed, the North, South, West, and two East schools. One of the East Schools, founded around the time of the Civil War, burned down in 1947 when its furnace exploded, and the Lincoln Akerman School replaced it in 1949. While a new school was being built, students had to travel to the neighboring town of Seabrook to attend school. The other East School was moved to an area near the new library. Another school was turned into a home, and another was crushed by a boulder one winter when students pushed it off a hill.

High school students attend Winnacunnet High School in the neighboring town of Hampton.

Heronfield Academy, a private Episcopal middle school, is located on Exeter Road on the border of Hampton Falls and Exeter.

=== Lincoln Akerman School ===
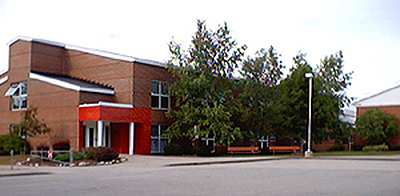
Lincoln Akerman School

Lincoln H. Akerman School (42°54′59″N 70°52′01″W) is a kindergarten through 8th grade elementary school and middle school. The school was constructed in 1949 and named after Lincoln Akerman (1916–1942), a local World War II hero and member of the prominent New Hampshire Akerman family.

In 1993, kindergarten was added to the school, though it is not required in the state of New Hampshire.

In the mid-1990s Dan Brown, future best-selling author of The Da Vinci Code, taught Spanish to the school's 6th, 7th, and 8th graders.

In 2003, Lincoln Akerman was cited in The Hampton Union for, according to the New Hampshire Educational Improvement and Assessment Program (NHEIAP), being notable for having scores that were "significantly above the state average" and climbing. Specific subjects cited were social studies, language arts, and math.

The current principal is Beth Raucci, who has held that position since 2018.

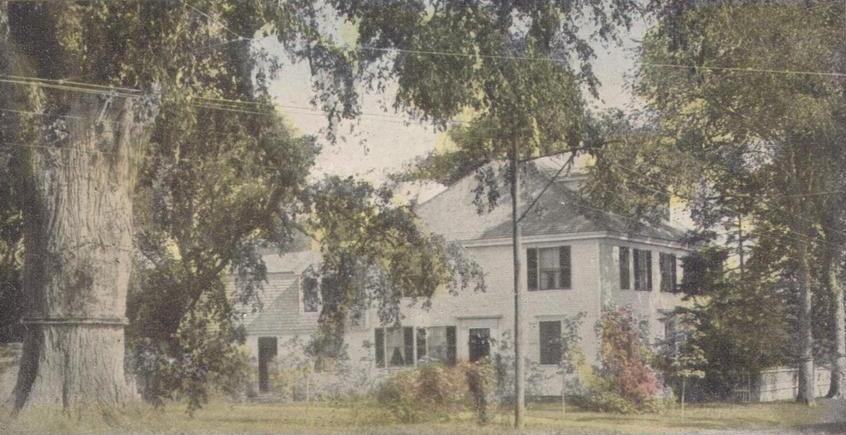
Elmfield, built in 1787, where summer resident John Greenleaf Whittier died in 1892. Image c. 1910

== Notable people ==
- Alice Brown (1856–1948), novelist, poet, playwright
- Warren Brown (1836–1919), politician, historian, gentleman farmer, businessman
- Harriet E. Clark (1850–1945), teacher and author
- Ralph Adams Cram (1863–1942), architect
- Eliphaz Dow (1705–1755), first male executed in New Hampshire
- Maura Healey (born 1971), 44th Massachusetts attorney general, 73rd governor of Massachusetts
- Scotty Lago (born 1987), Olympic bronze medalist snowboarder
- Samuel Langdon (1723–1797), pastor, president of Harvard University (1774–1780)
- Benson Leavitt (1797–1869), acting mayor of Boston
- Jonathan Leavitt (1797–1852), publisher
- Wesley Powell (1915–1981), 70th governor of New Hampshire
- Andy Pratt (born 1947), singer-songwriter
- Florence Ryerson (1892–1965), playwright; co-author of script for The Wizard of Oz (1939 film)
- Franklin Benjamin Sanborn (1831–1917), journalist, author, historian, abolitionist, social reformer
- John H. Sununu (born 1939), White House chief of staff, 75th governor of New Hampshire
- Nancy Sununu (1939–2024), former First Lady of New Hampshire and chair of the New Hampshire Republican Party
- Meshech Weare (1713–1786), first president of New Hampshire
- John Greenleaf Whittier (1807–1892), poet, abolitionist
- Paine Wingate (1739–1838), preacher, US senator
