= Hampton River (New Hampshire) =

- Location within New Hampshire Location within the United States

Location
- Country: United States
- State: New Hampshire
- County: Rockingham
- Towns: Hampton, Hampton Falls

Physical characteristics
- Source: Confluence of Taylor and Hampton Falls rivers
  - location: Hampton/Hampton Falls
  - coordinates: 42°54′47″N 70°50′44″W
  - elevation: 0 ft (0 m)
- Mouth: Hampton Harbor
  - location: Hampton
  - coordinates: 42°53′58″N 70°49′13″W
  - elevation: 0 ft (0 m)
- Length: 1.0 mi (1.6 km)

Basin features
- Tributaries
  - left: Tide Mill Creek

The Hampton River is a tidal inlet in the towns of Hampton and Hampton Falls, New Hampshire, the United States. It is surrounded by the largest salt marsh in New Hampshire, covering over 3,800 acres (15 km^{2}).

The river is formed by the confluence of the Taylor and Hampton Falls rivers. The Hampton River flows for one mile (1.6 km) before broadening into Hampton Harbor, an estuary which also receives flow from small tidal channels such as the Browns River and the Blackwater River. Hampton Harbor exits to the Atlantic Ocean through the Hampton Harbor Inlet, a dredged channel between Hampton Beach and Seabrook which is spanned by the Hampton Bridge.

== See also ==
- List of rivers of New Hampshire
- New Hampshire Historical Marker No. 120: Bound Rock
