= Hampton, New Hampshire =

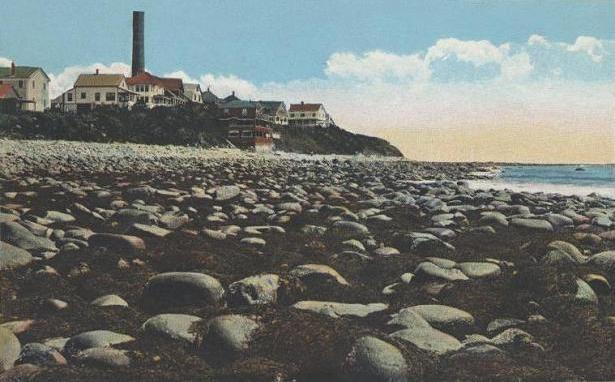
- Great Boar's Head c. 1920

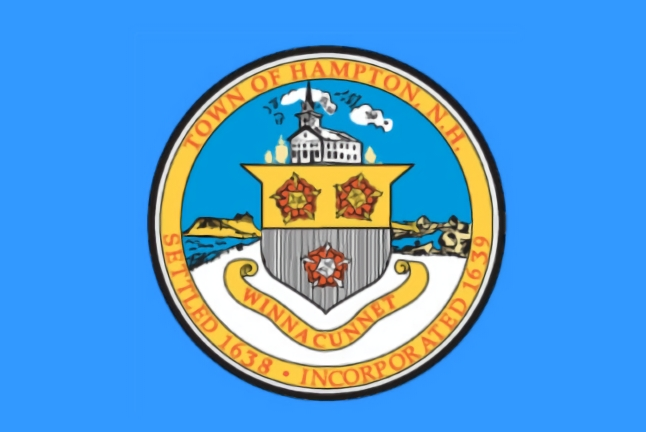
- Flag Seal

- Location in Rockingham County and the state of New Hampshire.
- Coordinates: 42°56′15″N 70°50′20″W
- Country: United States
- State: New Hampshire
- County: Rockingham
- Founded: October 14, 1638
- Incorporated: May 22, 1639
- Villages: Hampton; Hampton Beach; Great Boars Head; North Beach; Plaice Cove

Government
  - Board of Selectmen: Rusty Bridle, Chair; Carleigh Beriont; Chuck Rage; Jeff Grip; Amy Hansen
  - Town Manager: Jamie Sullivan

Area
  - Total: 14.6 sq mi (37.9 km^{2})
  - Land: 12.9 sq mi (33.4 km^{2})
  - Water: 1.7 sq mi (4.5 km^{2}) 11.76%
- Elevation: 36 ft (11 m)

Population (2020)
  - Total: 16,214
  - Density: 1,256/sq mi (484.9/km^{2})
- Time zone: UTC-5 (Eastern)
  - Summer (DST): UTC-4 (Eastern)
- ZIP codes: 03842–03843
- Area code: 603
- FIPS code: 33-33060
- GNIS feature ID: 0873616
- Website: hamptonnh.gov

Hampton is a town in Rockingham County, New Hampshire, United States. The population was 16,214 at the 2020 census. On the Atlantic coast, Hampton is home to Hampton Beach, a summer tourist destination, and part of the census-designated place of Seabrook Beach.

The densely populated central part of the town, where 9,597 people resided at the 2020 census, is defined as the Hampton census-designated place (CDP) and centers on the intersection of U.S. 1 and NH 27.

== History ==
First called the "Plantation of Winnacunnet", Hampton was one of four original New Hampshire townships chartered by the General Court of Massachusetts, which then held authority over the colony. Winnacunnet is an Algonquian Abenaki word meaning "pleasant pines" and is the name of the town's high school, serving students from Hampton and the surrounding towns of Seabrook, North Hampton, and Hampton Falls.

In March 1635, Richard Dummer and John Spencer of the Byfield section of Newbury, Massachusetts, came round in their shallop, coming ashore at the landing, and were much impressed by the location. Dummer, who was a member of the General Court, got that body to lay its claim to the section and plan a plantation here. The Massachusetts General Court of March 3, 1636, ordered that Dummer and Spencer be given power to "To presse men to build there a Bound house."

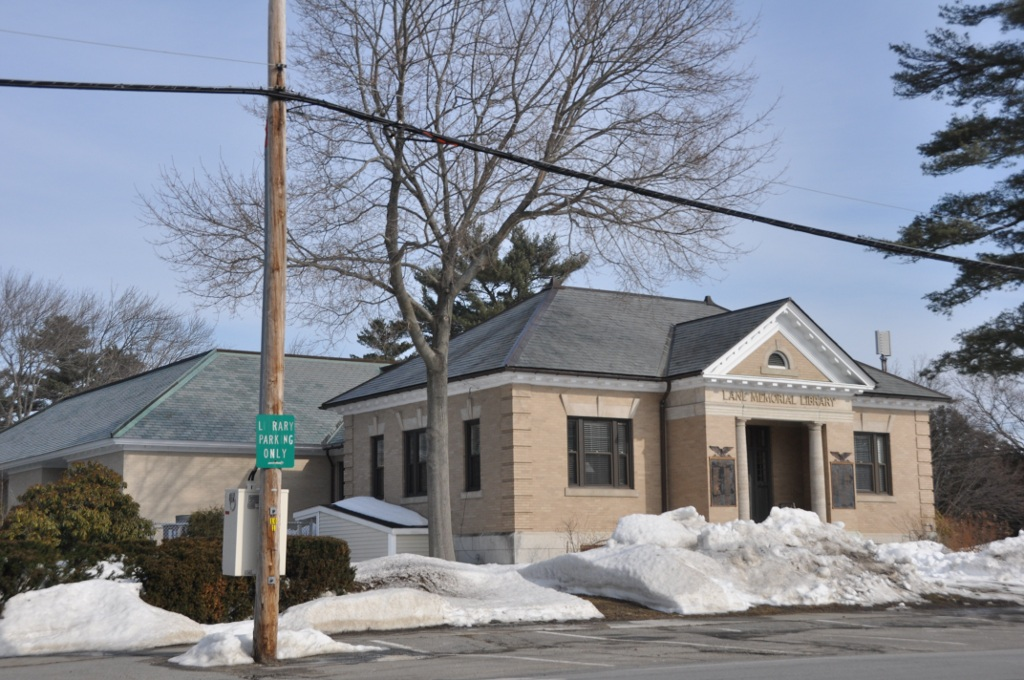
Lane Memorial Library

The town was settled in 1638 by a group of parishioners led by Oxford University graduate Reverend Stephen Bachiler,who had formerly preached at the settlement's namesake: Hampton, England.The town, incorporated in 1639, once included Seabrook, Kensington, Danville, Kingston, East Kingston, Sandown, North Hampton and Hampton Falls. Since Hampton was founded under the authority of the Massachusetts charter, it was the only one of the four New Hampshire towns that did not hold a vote to join Massachusetts. When the other three towns voted to join, Hampton became part of Old Norfolk County.

On September 18, 1679, the Acts of Privy Council records that Stephen Bachiler's son-in-law, "Christopher Hussey of Hampton, Esquire", was appointed by King Charles II to "govern the province of New Hampshire" as a member of the newly established council of seven men.

In 1683, Hampton Councilman Edward Gove launched a rebellion against the royal governor. He was arrested, and Crown Magistrate Richard Waldron sentenced him to be hanged, drawn, and quartered, the only time in New Hampshire history that one received that sentence. While Gove was waiting in the Tower of London, King James II commuted his sentence and he returned to Hampton.

Also among Hampton's earliest settlers was Thomas Leavitt, who previously had been among the first settlers at Exeter. His descendant Thomas Leavitt, Esq., lived in Hampton Falls, and was the leading Democratic politician in southern New Hampshire for many years. He made a noted early survey and plan of the town of Hampton in 1806. James Leavitt, of the same family, occupied the home which had previously belonged to Gen. Jonathan Moulton. Later members of the family ran Leavitts' Hampton Beach Hotel, a fixture in the area for generations.

Construction of the railroad in the 1850s, as well as the Exeter and Hampton Trolley line, made Hampton's oceanfront a popular resort. Hampton Beach remains a tourist destination, offering shops, restaurants, beaches, and summer seasonal housing.

== Geography ==
According to the United States Census Bureau, the town has a total area of 14.6 square miles (37.9 km^{2}), of which 12.9 square miles (33.4 km^{2}) are land and 1.7 square miles (4.5 km^{2}) are water, comprising 11.76% of the town.

Hampton is drained by the Hampton and Drakes rivers. The town lies fully within the New Hampshire Coastal watershed. The highest point in Hampton is Bride Hill (approximately 150 feet (46 m) above sea level), near the town line with Exeter.

=== Adjacent municipalities ===
- North Hampton (north)
- Seabrook (south)
- Hampton Falls (southwest)
- Exeter (northwest)

=== Climate ===
Climate data for Hampton, New Hampshire
Month	Jan	Feb	Mar	Apr	May	Jun	Jul	Aug	Sep	Oct	Nov	Dec	Year
Record high °F (°C)	61 (16)	66 (19)	79 (26)	91 (33)	99 (37)	95 (35)	101 (38)	100 (38)	94 (34)	87 (31)	76 (24)	68 (20)	101 (38)
Mean daily maximum °F (°C)	31.6 (−0.2)	33.8 (1.0)	42.2 (5.7)	53.6 (12.0)	65.0 (18.3)	74.3 (23.5)	79.8 (26.6)	77.8 (25.4)	70.3 (21.3)	59.7 (15.4)	48.5 (9.2)	36.1 (2.3)	56.1 (13.4)
Mean daily minimum °F (°C)	16.1 (−8.8)	18.0 (−7.8)	27.3 (−2.6)	36.7 (2.6)	46.7 (8.2)	55.7 (13.2)	61.6 (16.4)	60.0 (15.6)	52.2 (11.2)	42.0 (5.6)	33.8 (1.0)	21.8 (−5.7)	39.3 (4.1)
Record low °F (°C)	−16 (−27)	−9 (−23)	0 (−18)	17 (−8)	29 (−2)	38 (3)	47 (8)	40 (4)	32 (0)	23 (−5)	11 (−12)	−9 (−23)	−16 (−27)
Average precipitation inches (mm)	3.59 (91)	3.80 (97)	5.02 (128)	4.63 (118)	4.45 (113)	4.82 (122)	3.77 (96)	4.00 (102)	4.19 (106)	5.20 (132)	4.09 (104)	5.03 (128)	52.59 (1,336)
Average snowfall inches (cm)	18.6 (47)	20.5 (52)	10.9 (28)	1.4 (3.6)	0 (0)	0 (0)	0 (0)	0 (0)	0 (0)	0.2 (0.51)	0.8 (2.0)	10.2 (26)	62.6 (159)
Source: NOAA

Average sea temperature:
Jan	Feb	Mar	Apr	May	Jun	Jul	Aug	Sep	Oct	Nov	Dec	Year
41.7 °F (5.4 °C)	39.0 °F (3.9 °C)	39.0 °F (3.9 °C)	42.6 °F (5.9 °C)	50.2 °F (10.1 °C)	58.1 °F (14.5 °C)	65.1 °F (18.4 °C)	66.4 °F (19.1 °C)	63.0 °F (17.2 °C)	56.7 °F (13.7 °C)	50.0 °F (10.0 °C)	45.3 °F (7.4 °C)	51.4 °F (10.8 °C)

== Demographics ==
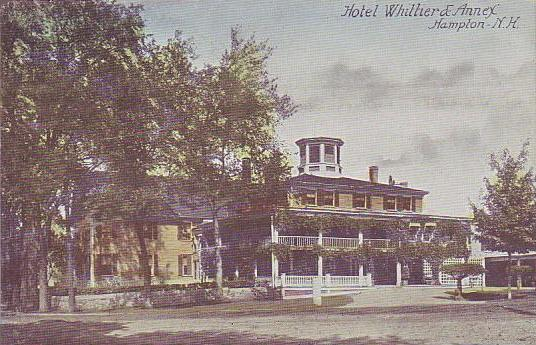
Hotel Whittier c. 1910

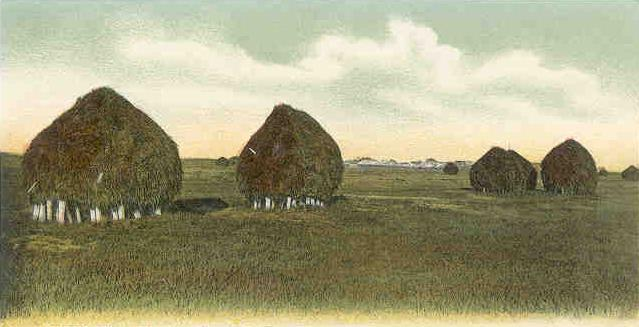
The marshes, c. 1905

Historical population
Census	Pop.	Note	%±
1790	853		—
1800	875		2.6%
1810	990		13.1%
1820	1,098		10.9%
1830	1,102		0.4%
1840	1,320		19.8%
1850	1,192		−9.7%
1860	1,230		3.2%
1870	1,177		−4.3%
1880	1,184		0.6%
1890	1,330		12.3%
1900	1,209		−9.1%
1910	1,215		0.5%
1920	1,251		3.0%
1930	1,507		20.5%
1940	2,137		41.8%
1950	2,847		33.2%
1960	5,379		88.9%
1970	8,011		48.9%
1980	10,493		31.0%
1990	12,324		17.4%
2000	14,973		21.5%
2010	14,976		0.0%
2020	16,214		8.3%
U.S. Decennial Census

As of the census of 2010, there were 14,976 people, 6,868 households, and 4,079 families residing in the town. There were 9,921 housing units, of which 3,053, or 30.8%, were vacant. 2,221 of the vacant units were for seasonal or recreational uses. The racial makeup of the town was 96.1% White, 0.6% African American, 0.2% Native American, 1.2% Asian, 0.1% Native Hawaiian or Pacific Islander, 0.5% some other race, and 1.3% from two or more races. 1.7% of the population were Hispanic or Latino of any race.

Of the 6,868 households, 23.2% had children under the age of 18 living with them, 47.2% were headed by married couples living together, 8.3% had a female householder with no husband present, and 40.6% were non-families. 33.7% of all households were made up of individuals, and 12.2% were someone living alone who was 65 years of age or older. The average household size was 2.16, and the average family size was 2.77.

In the town, 17.5% of the population were under the age of 18, 7.0% were from 18 to 24, 22.3% from 25 to 44, 35.1% from 45 to 64, and 18.2% were 65 years of age or older. The median age was 47.0 years. For every 100 females, there were 99.4 males. For every 100 females age 18 and over, there were 99.0 males.

For the period 2011–2015, the estimated median annual income for a household was $76,836, and the median income for a family was $98,642. Male full-time workers had a median income of $65,519 versus $51,009 for females. The per capita income for the town was $45,189. 5.9% of the population and 4.7% of families were below the poverty line. 5.9% of the population under the age of 18 and 2.5% of those 65 or older were living in poverty.

== Education ==
Hampton is part of School Administrative Unit 90, which covers the elementary and middle schools, and SAU 21 which includes Winnacunnet High School, a regional high school serving Hampton and several surrounding communities.

== Economy ==
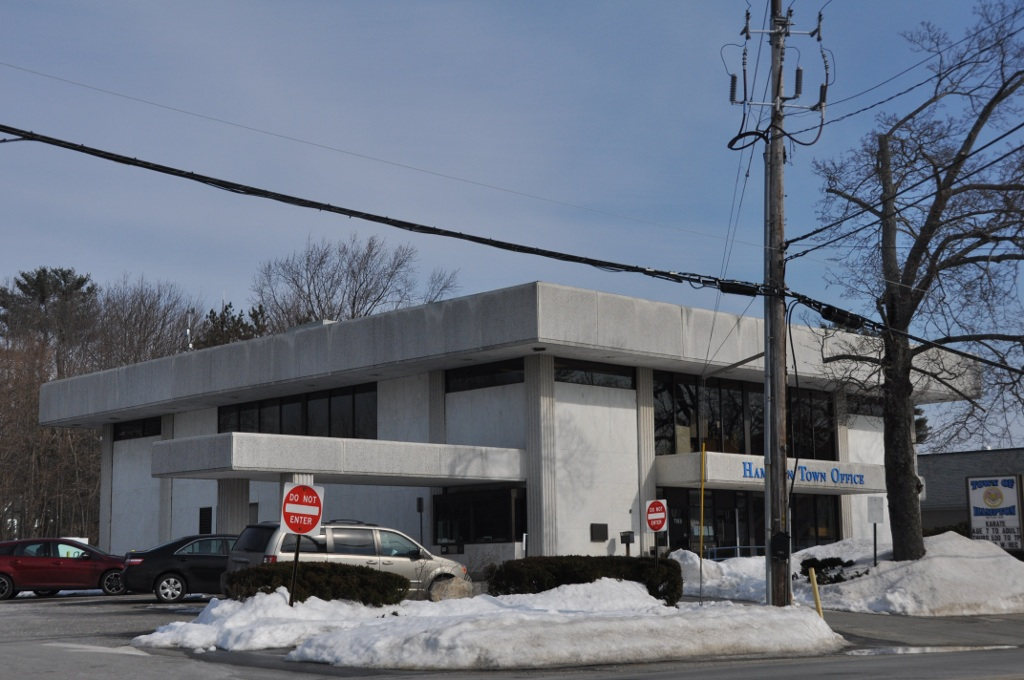
Town hall

Hampton is home to the headquarters of Planet Fitness.

== Sites of interest ==
- Benjamin James House (1723)
- Hampton Beach State Park
- Hampton Beach Casino Ballroom

== Notable people ==
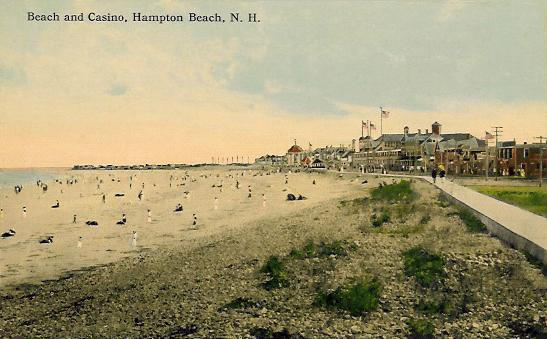
Beach & Casino c. 1910

- Bill Alfonso (born 1957), professional wrestling personality
- Stephen Bachiler (1561–1656), English clergyman; town founder
- Nicholas Bridle (born 1983-), New Hampshire state representative
- Eunice "Goody" Cole (c. 1590–1680), the only woman convicted of witchcraft in New Hampshire
- Henry Dearborn (1751–1829), physician, general and 5th U.S. Secretary of War
- Abraham Drake (1715–1781), Continental Army during the Revolutionary War and politician
- Jimmy Dunn, stand-up comedian, actor
- Christopher Hussey (1599–1686), English nobleman, one of the original founders of Nantucket, Massachusetts
- Thomas Leavitt (1616–1696), early settler
- Paul Maher Jr. (born 1963), author
- Stephen E. Merrill (1946–2020), 77th governor of New Hampshire
- Jonathan Moulton (1726–1787), Revolutionary War era brigadier general
- Jane Pierce (1806–1863), First Lady of the United States, wife of Franklin Pierce
- Robert Preston (1929–2021), businessman and New Hampshire state senator
- Trish Regan (born 1972), business news broadcaster
- Tristram Shaw (1786–1843), U.S. congressman
