= Cherryl Fountain =

English artist (born 1950)

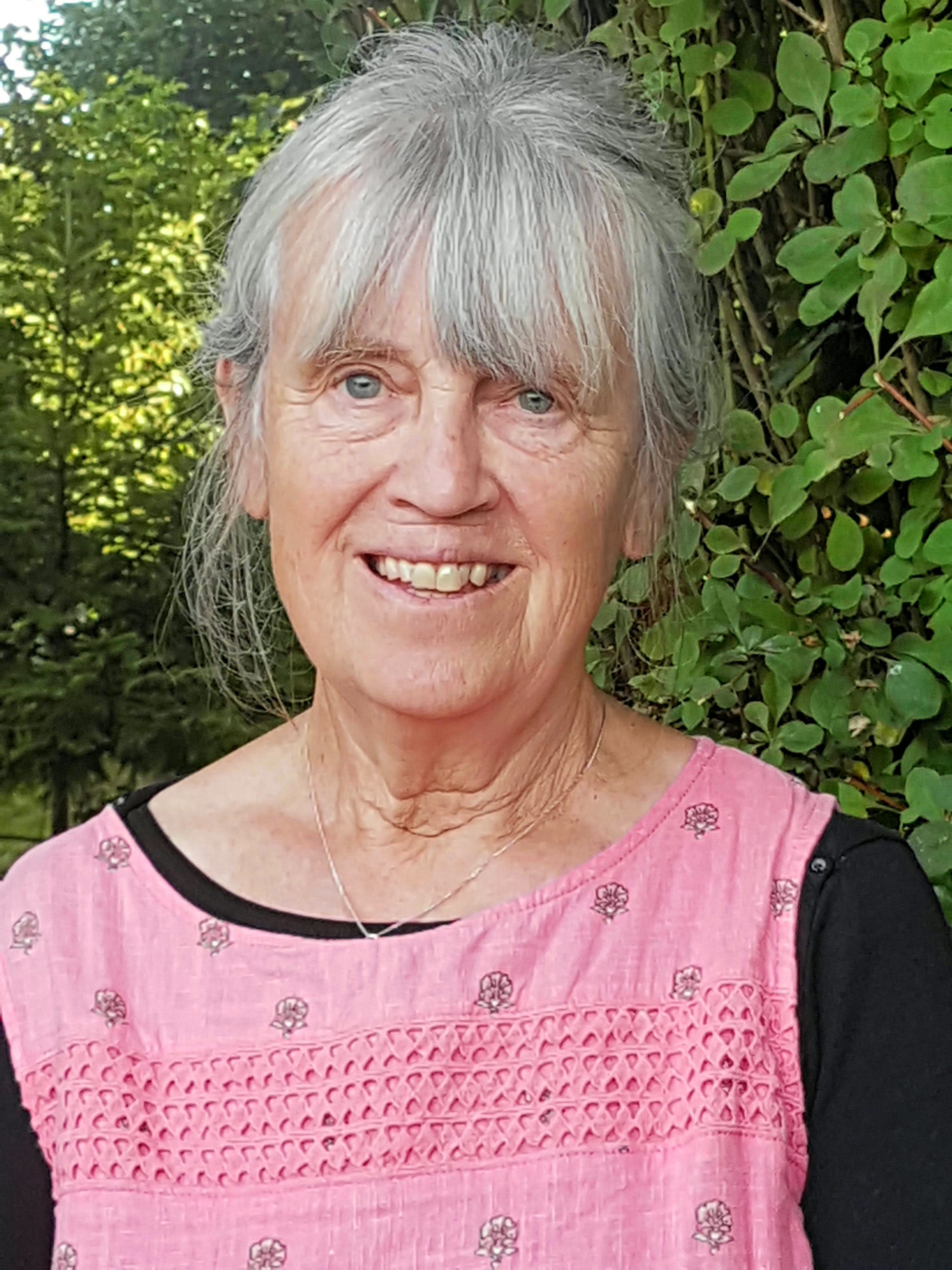
- Cherryl Fountain, in 2021
- Born: 1950 (age 75–76); Lincolnshire, England
- Education: Reading University (1972); Brighton Polytechnic (1973); Royal Academy Schools (1977)
- Known for: Still life, landscape painting, botanical art
- Style: Figurative art
- Website: cherrylfountain.artweb.com

Cherryl Angela Fountain (born 1950) is an English still life, landscape and botanical artist. As the daughter of a gamekeeper and a resident of rural east Kent, much of her work reflects an environment of farming, botanical gardens and country life. Her work has been accepted for exhibition at the Royal Academy Summer Exhibition on 28 occasions, and she has received bursaries and numerous awards in honour of her work.

== Early life and inspiration ==
Cherryl Angela Fountain was born in 1950 in Lincolnshire, the daughter of gamekeeper Peter Robin Fountain and Ruby Margaret Elmer, (Note: GRO index: Births Sep 1950 Fountain Cherryl A., mother Elmer Scunthorpe 3b 518) who were both originally from Yorkshire. (Note: GRO index: Births Sep 1916 Fountain Peter R. Elwick York 9d 36. Births Sep 1921 Elmer Ruby M. Minister York 9d 13. Marriages Jun 1941 Fountain Peter Robin and Elmer Ruby Margaret Knaresbro 9a 271) Her mother and her brother Julian have been referenced in her drawings and paintings. (Note: GRO index: Births Sep 1944 Fountain John G. mother Elmer Knaresbro' 9a 90, Births Dec 1964 Fountain Julian M., mother Elmer Canterbury 5B 407)

An early patron was Henry George Herbert Milles-Lade (1940–1996), the 5th Earl Sondes of Lees Court, and Stringmans Farm, Badlesmere, Kent, where, from at least 1954, Fountain's father Peter was head gamekeeper for many years, running "one of Britain's best shoots". The hunting background is reflected in the hunting subjects of some works, including Beater's Hut.

== Education ==
Fountain read fine art at the University of Reading, graduating in 1972. She trained as a teacher at Brighton Polytechnic, qualifying in 1973. Between January 1975 and June 1977 she was a student at the Royal Academy Schools, where she was taught by Jane Dowling and the portrait painter Peter Greenham, among others. At the Royal Academy she was also a student of Roderic Barrett, and as a former student she took part in an exhibition in his memory at the Chappel Galleries in 2006.

=== Scholarships ===
Fountain received two scholarships which are reflected in her work. The first, in 1978, was a bursary from the Government of Italy, dedicated to painting and art history in Perugia. The second, in 1983, was a bursary from the Richard Ford Foundation, which was founded by Sir Brinsley Ford "to enable young painters to study masterpieces in the Prado", Madrid.

== Career ==
Much of Fountain's work has been informed by the environment of rural east Kent. She is an established, figurative, still life and landscape artist "with a particular interest in colour combinations", and a botanical artist. Her still life artwork includes "taxidermy, fossils, exotic plants and vegetables".

=== Commissioned work ===
Works by Fountain have been varied and include the Baptismal Roll (2000) which is an illustrated manuscript now kept at Selling Church, Kent, and portraits of Nigel Nicolson and Claire Palley. Work now in the possession of the National Trust Foundation for Art includes projects at Sissinghurst Castle Garden, Nymans, Stoneacre, Barrington Court and Mompesson House.

In 2013, Fountain created a backdrop for Jim Marshall's Malmaison Carnations exhibit, which won a gold medal at the Hampton Court Flower Show. At the 2015 Chelsea Flower Show, Fountain produced backdrops for irises bred by Cedric Morris, for the Howard Nurseries' Gold Medal exhibit in the Grand Pavilion.

=== Teaching ===
Between 1991 and 2000 she taught art and design at The North School in Ashford, Kent. She also taught painting and drawing for adults, on behalf of Kent County Council, for over 20 years.

== Exhibitions ==
=== Royal Academy Summer Exhibition ===
Over 28 summers, between 1975 and 2013, at least 40 of Fountain's works were accepted for show at the Royal Academy Summer Exhibitions. Various art interests and Kent institutions have recognised Fountain's achievement in this respect, including the author Geoff Hassell; Pippa Palmar for Kent County Council and Hadlow College and Katherine Tyrell, for the Society of Botanical Artists.

=== Solo and two-person exhibitions ===
Between 1983 and 2004, Fountain's work was shown in solo and two-person exhibitions bearing her name.

- New Grafton Gallery, London (1981, 1983, 1986);
- Beaney House of Art and Knowledge (formerly the Royal Museum) Canterbury (1983, 1984, 1986);
- Open Eye Gallery Edinburgh (1985);
- Drew Gallery, Canterbury (1987);
- Canterbury Fringe Festival; The Tabernacle, Machynlleth, Wales; and the John Davies Gallery, Stow-on-the-Wold (1994);
- Mompesson House, Salisbury (1996);
- Nevill Gallery, Canterbury; and Fleur de Lis Heritage Centre, Faversham, Kent (2004).

In 2008, Fountain exhibited alongside Brenda Evans at Horsebridge Arts Centre in Whitstable.

=== Group exhibitions ===
Over several decades, Fountain's work has been shown in group exhibitions, including:

- Singer Friedlander Exhibition, Royal Society of Portrait Painters;
- English Watercolour, Waterman Fine Art, London;
- Beaney House of Art and Knowledge, Canterbury;
- World of Watercolour, Park Lane Hotel, London;
- The Broad Horizon Thomas Agnew & Sons;
- Tenterden Gallery;
- Bourne Gallery, Reigate;
- Open Eye, Edinburgh;
- Drew Gallery, Canterbury;
- Painter-Etchers Exhibition, London;
- Royal Watercolour Society;
- Mall Galleries, London;
- New Grafton Gallery, London;
- The Piccadilly Gallery, London;
- Maas Gallery, London.

National Trust exhibitions were: Centenary Exhibition at Christie's, The Long Perspective at Agnews and Storm Struck at Petworth.

In 1991, two pieces by Fountain were exhibited by the London-based arts charity Discerning Eye: Kentish Garden and Cottage Door. In 1992, Discerning Eye showed One O'Clock in the Rose Garden and White Garden in August.

Her work was shown at the Museum of Modern Art, Machynlleth, in 2017–2018. In 2019, she exhibited at Plantae, the annual exhibition of the Society of Botanical Artists. The watercolours shown at Plantae were: Aunt Dusty, Paul Cook's Miss Indiana and Beauty and the Beast. In the "Inspired at Mompesson House" exhibition in March 2020, Fountain's painting of May Griffin in the Garden at Mompesson featured as a solo display in one of the rooms. It was painted as a National Trust Centenary celebration in 1995.

== Awards ==
- 1978, Greenshields Foundation Award for Painting.
- 1991, Abbott and Holder Travel Award, Royal Watercolour Society.
- 2017, St Cuthberts Mill Award "for outstanding watercolour work", Society of Botanical Artists, for Benton Susan and Springs Lease.
- 2019, Certificate of Exhibiting Excellence for "the most inspiring use of colour", Society of Botanical Artists, for The Beauty and the Beast.

== Reviews ==
- "She is bang in that line of English eccentric artists, Blake, Calvert, Samuel Palmer, Richard Palmer and Stanley Spencer. These painters had no doubts about their work because they have a skill which enables them to give full rein to their zest for their subjects. Cherryl`s sheer application is amazing." John Ward (1996).
- With respect to The Kitchen Garden, Barrington Court, Somerset (1995) and Fountain's other works: "[Plants] ... are depicted in the meticulous and colourful detail typical of the artist’s style ... she enhances our perception that flowers please our sense of smell, that fruit enhances our sense of taste and that landscapes often have distant outcrops as sharp to our eyes as the rocky foreground." Dudley Dodd, independent scholar of the Historic Buildings Department of the National Trust (1996).
- "At the head of my list I would place Peter Greenham and his wife, Jane Dowling, for I have long been not only a great admirer of their work but also of that of the artists who have studied under them — Cherryl Fountain, Peter Kuhfeld, Edmund Fairfax-Lucy, Martin Shortis and Martin Yeoman." Sir Brinsley Ford (1991).
- "Outstanding colour work", Penny Stenning, editor of the Society of Botanical Artists journal Scattered seeds (2017).
- "Outstanding watercolour painting", Katherine Tyrrell (2017).
- "I used to be absolutely amazed by her complex still life paintings and garden paintings. She has recently begun to paint more flowers - and her brother's extensive collection of chillis!" Katherine Tyrrell (2020). (Note: Katherine Tyrell is the spokesperson for Botanical Art and Artists, the resource site for the Royal Watercolour Society, and the author of: Katherine Tyrrell (2015) Sketching 365: Build your confidence and skills with a tip a day, Apple Press, United Kingdom ISBN 9781845435561)

== Reproductions of artworks ==
- Fountain, Cherryl A. (July 1976). "Cowslips in a Kentish landscape (1975): art reproduction". Apollo: The International Magazine for Collectors. 104: 69. ISSN 0003-6536..
- Fountain, Cherryl A. (July 1979). "Perugian view from Assisi to San Domenico, (art reproduction)". RIBA Journal: 355. ISSN 0953-6973..
- Buckley, Sarah (1 September 1991). Practical Watercolour Techniques. Tiger Books. ISBN 9781855011809..
- Wood, Laurence (12 August 1993). Watercolour Masterclass: Learning from Professional Artists at Work. Harper Collins. ISBN 9780004126494..
- Harrison, Hazel (1 June 2004). Encyclopedia of Watercolour Techniques: A step-by-step visual directory, with an inspirational gallery of finished works. Search Press. ISBN 9781844480364.

== Collections ==
Fountain's work is included in the permanent collections of the Museum of Modern Art, Wales, and the National Trust for Places of Historic Interest or Natural Beauty, whose pieces by Fountain are kept in the following locations: Mompesson House, Wiltshire; Sissinghurst Castle Garden; Nymans Estate, West Sussex; Mount Stewart, County Down; and Barrington Court, Somerset.

== Publications ==
- Fountain, Cherryl; et al. (1995). Badlesmere: some historical notes. (featuring drawings by Fountain on the front page)
- Fountain, Cherryl A.; et al. (1 May 1986). Oral Communication Methods for the Classroom Teacher. Kendall Hunt Publishing Company. ISBN 9780840339287.
