= High School North =

High School North may refer to:

== United States ==
=== New Jersey ===
- Hamilton High School North, former name of Nottingham High School in Hamilton, New Jersey
- Middletown High School North, Middletown Township, New Jersey
- Toms River High School North, Toms River, New Jersey
- Vineland Senior High School North, Vineland, New Jersey
- West Windsor-Plainsboro High School North, Plainsboro, New Jersey

=== Pennsylvania ===
- Council Rock High School North, Newtown, Bucks County, Pennsylvania
- East Stroudsburg High School North, Dingmans Ferry, Pennsylvania

=== New York ===
- Clarkstown High School North, New City, New York
- Sachem High School North, Lake Ronkonkoma, New York

=== Texas ===
- Killough Lewisville High School North, Lewisville, Texas
- Lutheran High School North (Texas), former name of Lutheran North Academy in Houston, Texas

=== Other states ===
- Bloomington High School North, Bloomington Indiana
- Luther High School North, Portage Park, Chicago
- Lutheran High School North (Michigan), Macomb Township, Michigan
- Lutheran High School North (Missouri), St. Louis County, Missouri
- Nashua High School North, Nashua, New Hampshire
- Pickerington High School North, Pickerington, Ohio

== See also ==
- North High School (disambiguation)
- Northern High School (disambiguation)
- North School (disambiguation)
