= Greeley House =

Greeley House may refer to:

- Dr. Paul W. and Eunice Greeley House, Winnetka, Illinois, listed on the National Register of Historic Places (NRHP)
- Greeley House (East Kingston, New Hampshire), NRHP-listed
- Greeley House (Chappaqua, New York), NRHP-listed
