= Massachusetts Route 150 =

State highway in Essex County, Massachusetts, US

Route 150
- Route 150 highlighted in red

Route information
- Maintained by MassDOT
- Length: 3.67 mi (5.91 km)
- Existed: 1933–1936–present

Major junctions
- South end: Beacon Street in Amesbury
- I-495 in Amesbury
- North end: NH 150 at the New Hampshire state line in Amesbury

Location
- Country: United States
- State: Massachusetts
- Counties: Essex

Highway system
- Massachusetts State Highway System; Interstate; US; State
← Route 149	→ Route 151

Route 150 is a 3.67-mile-long (5.91 km) short south–north highway entirely in Amesbury, Massachusetts. It begins at Beacon Street and continues as NH 150. The highway is the main south-north thoroughfare in Amesbury, and serves as a southward continuation of NH 150, connecting Amesbury to the New Hampshire town of Kensington and ultimately, Exeter.

== Route description ==
Route 150 begins at an intersection with Beacon Street, an unusual instance that a numbered route does not have its terminus with another numbered route. Less than a half mile north is the intersection with Interstate 495 at Exit 54, which is the first exit on the southbound side of the interstate. Route 150 intersects with Route 110 (Haverhill Road) about one-quarter mile further north. After this intersection, Route 150 then becomes the primary thoroughfare through the center of the city, passing through the more densely populated and commercialized downtown of Amesbury. During this section, the road splits for about one-quarter mile into two one-way segments, with the northbound and southbound sides carrying traffic through different parts of downtown before rejoining together. This one-way southbound route passes through a roundabout and shortly after the two sides rejoin, the two-way road passes through another roundabout. After travelling through downtown Amesbury the road reaches the more rural northern section of the city and then crosses into South Hampton, New Hampshire. The highway becomes New Hampshire Route 150 upon crossing the state line.

== Major intersections ==
The entire route is in Amesbury, Essex County.

mi	km	Destinations	Notes
0.00	0.00	Beacon Street	Southern terminus
0.40	0.64	I-495 – Salisbury, Haverhill	Exit 118 on I-495; partial cloverleaf interchange
0.70	1.13	Route 110 – Merrimac, Salisbury	
2.20	3.54	To NH 107A north	Access via South Hampton Road
3.67	5.91	NH 150 north	Continuation into New Hampshire
1.000 mi = 1.609 km; 1.000 km = 0.621 mi
