= Martin Yeoman =

English painter

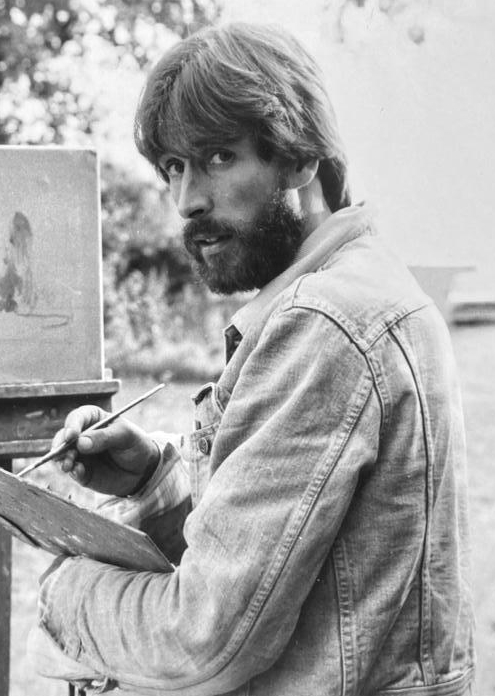
- Born: 1953 (age 72–73); Surrey, England
- Education: Royal Academy Schools 1975–1979
- Occupation: Artist
- Known for: Drawing the Grandchildren of Queen Elizabeth II, Accompanying Prince of Wales on official overseas tours.
- Notable work: Sir Alan Hodgkin OM, Pen & Ink
- Movement: New English Art Club
- Website: martinyeomanartist.com

Martin Yeoman (born 1953) is an English painter and draughtsman who drew members of the British Royal Family. He was commissioned to draw the Queen's grandchildren and accompanied Charles, Prince of Wales, on overseas tours as tour artist. He is described as one of the finest draughtsmen working today and is a member of Senior Faculty at the Royal Drawing School.

== Early life and education ==
Yeoman was born in Surrey in 1953. In 1973, Yeoman sold his drawings in India and Pakistan before returning to England to attend art school. He was Peter Greenham's guest student at the Royal Academy Schools. Yeoman's work was first discovered by the Art Collector Sir Brinsley Ford at the premiums exhibition of second year students' work. Yeoman won the silver medal for Drawing, the David Murray Landscape Scholarship, and the Richard Ford Scholarship which allowed him to study abroad in Spain.

== Career ==
In 1983, Christopher Wall of the National Trust gave Yeoman the chance to paint Basildon Park and Ashdown House. Yeoman was later commissioned for other paintings by the National Trust's Foundation for Art.

In November 1986, Yeoman accompanied Charles, Prince of Wales, on an official tour of the Gulf States to teach the prince to paint. A few months later, Yeoman returned to the Gulf States under the sponsorship of Sheikh Khalifa of Qatar. The trip also included visiting North Yemen. Yeoman was invited by Charles, Prince of Wales on further official tours, one to Hong Kong in November 1989 and India and Nepal in February 1992.

July 1988, Yeoman was commissioned by HM Queen Elizabeth II to create a drawing of physiologist and biophysicist Sir Alan Hodgkin OM, the portrait of which forms part of a series depicting members of the Order of Merit.

In 1992, he was commissioned by the Royal Household to draw the grandchildren of Queen Elizabeth II to honour the 40th anniversary of her reign. The drawings were later shown on the Royal Landing at the National Portrait Gallery in 1993. The drawings are now housed in the Royal Collection at Windsor Castle.

His painting, Salisbury Cathedral, created in 1994, is housed in the collection of Mompesson House in Wiltshire.

Yeoman's painting of Sir James Whyte Black was commissioned by The National Portrait Gallery in 1994 for their permanent collection.

In 1996, Yeoman worked in Yemen on a series of etchings to be used in Tim Mackintosh-Smith's first book Yemen: travels in Dictionary Land. The British Council organised an exhibition of Yeoman's work in the capital Sanaa.

In 2002, Yeoman was commissioned to paint Mathew Sheeran and Ed Sheeran, his painting 'Ed Sheeran 2002' was included in the 2019 exhibition "Ed Sheeran: Made in Suffolk".

The British Museum exhibition titled 'Yemen, Solomon & Sheba' included Yeoman's drawing titled 'A man from Taizz, 1996'. The subject is of a figure drawn from life within the old city of Sanaa, Yemen. The drawing is held within collection of the British Museum.

His painting of D-Day pilot Laurence 'Laurie' Weeden was commissioned by Charles, Prince of Wales, for the exhibition "The Last of the Tide" at the Queen's Gallery in Buckingham Palace.

One of Yeoman's self-portraits was bought by the Ruth Borchard Collection in 2016. Yeoman occasionally teaches drawing and painting at the Royal Drawing School and is an elected member of the New English Art Club and Royal Society of Portrait Painters.

Yeoman won the Ondaatje Prize for portraiture in 2002 and the Doreen McIntosh Prize in 2016.

== Work in collections ==
- Queen Elizebeth II
- The Prince of Wales
- Sir Brinsley Ford
- Diocese of Birmingham
- Baring Brothers
- Grimsby School of Art
- National Portrait Gallery
- British Council
- British Museum
- Ruth Borchard Collection 2015

== Selected exhibitions ==
- 1976-1977 Royal Academy Summer Exhibition
- 1979-1990 Royal Academy Summer Exhibition
- 1981 Imperial Tobacco Portrait Award (National Portrait Gallery)
- 1985 Imperial Tobacco Portrait Award (National Portrait Gallery)
- 1985 Six Young Artists (Agnews)
- 1986 Highgate Gallery
- 1987 Two Tours of the Middle East (Agnews)
- 1987 Four Painters (New Grafton Gallery)
- 1987 The Long Perspective (National Trust Exhibition, Agnews)
- 1988 A Personal Choice (Fermoy Gallery)
- 1989 Salute to Turner (National Trust Exhibition, Agnews)
- 1990 New Grafton Gallery
- 1992-1996 Royal Academy Summer Exhibition
- 1992 The Order of Merit (National Portrait Gallery)
- 1993 The Queen's Grandchildren (National Portrait Gallery)
- 1994 Selected Works (Mompesson House National Trust)
- 1995 Christopher Wood Contemporary Art
- 1997 Yeoman's Yemen (British Council exhibition National Art Gallery Sanaa and John Martin of London)
- 2000 Paintings in the Holy Land (Alan Kluckow Fine Art)
- 2002 Hindustan to Malabar (Offer Waterman and Co)
- 2004 India (Indar Pasricha Fine Art)
- 2015 The Last of the Tide (Queen's Gallery Buckingham Palace)
- 2016 BP Portrait Award (Nat Portrait Gallery)

== Bibliography as illustrator ==
- Tim Mackintosh-Smith (July 1998). Yemen Travels in Dictionary Land. John Murray. ISBN 07195-56228.
- Tim Mackintosh-Smith (2001). Travels with a Tangerine: From Morocco to Turkey in the Footsteps of Islam's Greatest Traveler. 50 Albemarle Street, London, W1S 4BD: John Murray. ISBN 0-7195-5849-2.
- Tim Mackintosh-Smith (1 August 2011). Landfalls On the Edge of Islam with Ibn Battutah. John Murray. ISBN 978-0-7195-6787-2.
- Tim Mackintosh-Smith (1 March 2006). The Hall of a Thousand Columns. John Murray. ISBN 1-58567-001-4.
