= Kensington Town House =

- U.S. National Register of Historic Places
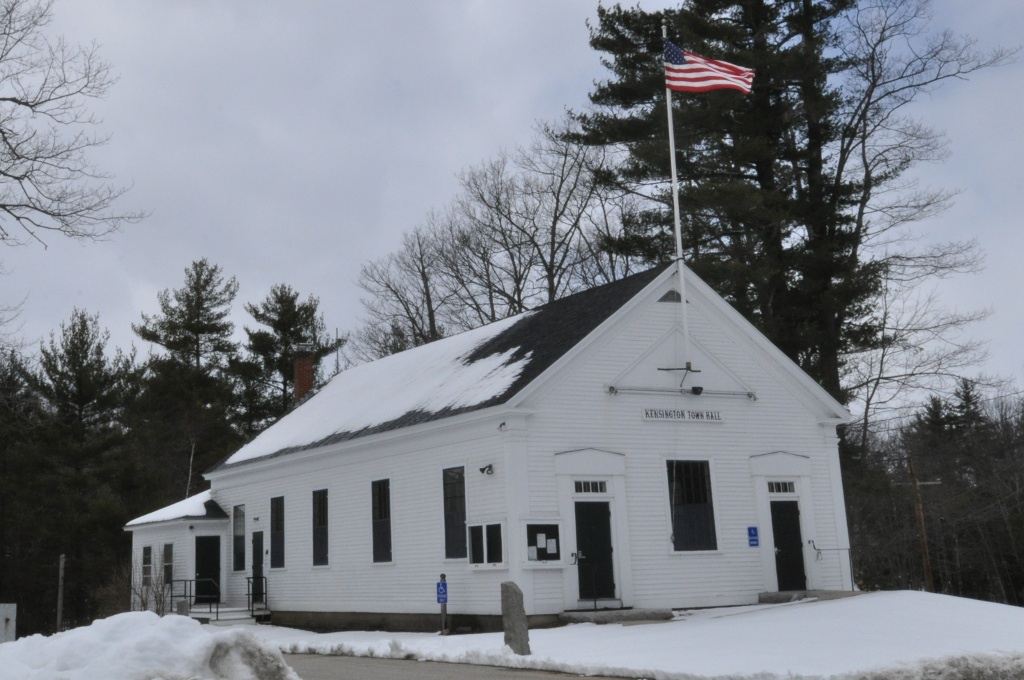

- Location within New Hampshire Location within the United States
- Location: 95 Amesbury Road, Kensington, New Hampshire
- Coordinates: 42°55′54″N 70°56′43″W
- Area: Less than one acre
- Built: 1846
- Architectural style: Greek Revival
- NRHP reference No.: 13000155
- Added to NRHP: April 9, 2013

The Kensington Town House is the town hall of Kensington, New Hampshire. Located at 95 Amesbury Road (New Hampshire Route 150), the single-story wood-frame building was erected in 1846, and has been its only purpose-built municipal hall. It is a good local example of civic Greek Revival architecture, and its hall has historically hosted town meetings and social functions. The building was listed on the National Register of Historic Places in 2013.

== Description and history ==
The Kensington Town House is located near the geographic center of the town, on the west side of Amesbury Road at its junction with Osgood Road. It is set in a small cluster of civic buildings that includes two Greek Revival churches. It is a 1 1/2-story wood-frame structure, with a gabled roof and clapboarded exterior. Its main facade faces roughly east, and is basically symmetrical, with a pair of entrances flanking a central sash window. The entrances are flanked by pilasters and topped by transom windows and peaked entablatures. The building corners are also pilastered, with an entablature running below the eaves along the sides. In the gable above is a triangular panel, on which is mounted a flagpole stand, from which an American flag is normally hung. The interior has a meeting space on the main level, and a basement space in which town offices are kept.

The town of Kensington was originally part of first Hampton and then Hampton Falls, before being separately incorporated in 1762. Its first colonial meeting house was built in this area in 1733, and the second replaced it in 1770–71. By the 1840s religious groups had ended their use of the building, which was judged too large for the town's needs. The old building was dismantled and the present structure built in 1846. Its original foundation included stones used from that of the old building, and it may incorporate timbers of the old structure. The building was enlarged in the 1880s, and a two-story addition (its height obscured because of lower grade) was added in 1918, at which time the stage and proscenium were added to the main hall. In addition to housing town meetings, the building has hosted private events, community organizational meetings, and social events such as dances and balls. In the 1970s, the town began using a new and larger American Legion hall for its town meetings.

== See also ==
- National Register of Historic Places listings in Rockingham County, New Hampshire
