= New Hampshire Route 84 =

State highway in Rockingham County, New Hampshire, US

New Hampshire Route 84
- Map of Rockingham County in southeastern New Hampshire with NH 84 highlighted in red

Route information
- Maintained by NHDOT
- Length: 4.184 mi (6.733 km)

Major junctions
- West end: NH 150 in Kensington
- East end: US 1 in Hampton Falls

Location
- Country: United States
- State: New Hampshire
- Counties: Rockingham

Highway system
- New Hampshire Highway System; Interstate; US; State; Turnpikes
← NH 78	→ NH 85

New Hampshire Route 84 is a 4.184-mile-long (6.733 km) secondary east–west state highway in Rockingham County in southeastern New Hampshire. The western terminus is in Kensington at New Hampshire Route 150. The eastern terminus of NH 84 is in Hampton Falls at U.S. Route 1.

== Route description ==
NH 84 begins at an intersection with NH 150 in Kensington. After less than a mile, it crosses into Hampton Falls, heading eastward towards downtown. NH 84 crosses over Interstate 95 without an interchange (access via NH 101 or NH 107) and turns north, ending at US 1 just feet from the eastern terminus of NH 88.

NH 84 is known as Kensington Road in Hampton Falls and Lamprey Road in Kensington.

== Junction list ==
The entire route is in Rockingham County.

Location	mi	km	Destinations	Notes
Kensington	0.000	0.000	NH 150 (Amesbury Road) – South Hampton, Exeter	Western terminus
Hampton Falls	4.184	6.733	US 1 (Lafayette Road) to NH 88 – Seabrook, Hampton	Eastern terminus
1.000 mi = 1.609 km; 1.000 km = 0.621 mi

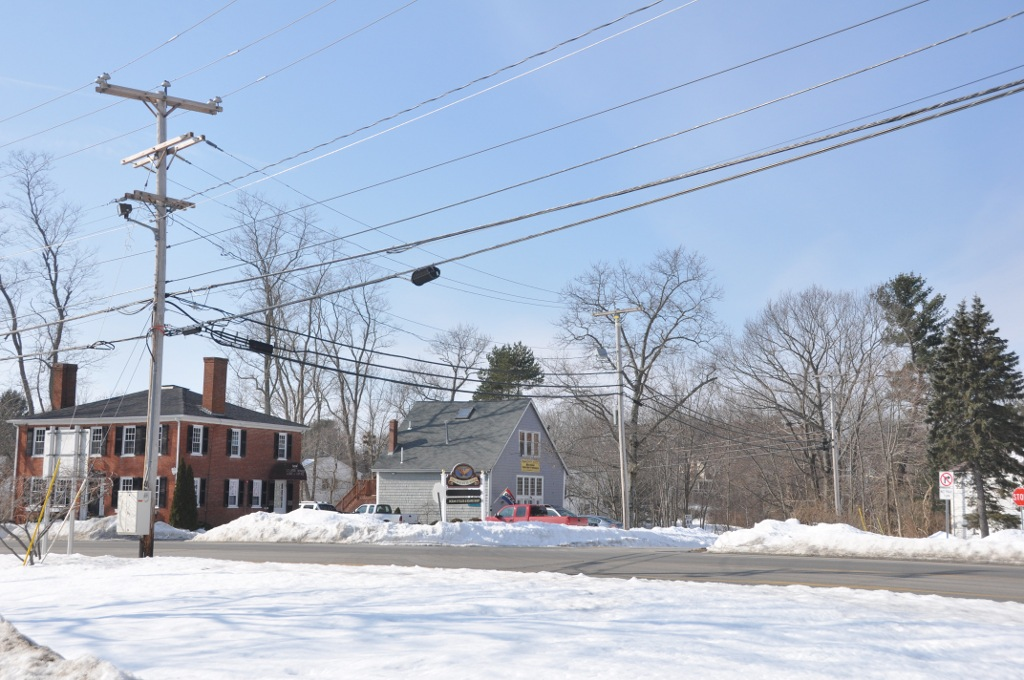
The eastern terminus of NH 84 in Hampton Falls
