= Lutheran High School North =

Lutheran High School North may refer to:

- Lutheran High School North (Michigan), Macomb Township, Michigan
- Lutheran High School North (Missouri), St. Louis, Missouri
- Lutheran High School North (Texas), Houston, Texas
