= NH 84 =

NH 84 may refer to:

- National Highway 84 (India)
- New Hampshire Route 84, United States
