= Novella Bridges =

African American chemical engineer, researcher, and STEM advocate

- Born: Novella Bridges; August 9, 1972; Detroit, Michigan
- Education: Jackson State University Louisiana State University
- Awards: 23 Most Distinguished Women in Chemistry/Chemical Engineering, Regional Industrial Innovation
- Scientific career
- Fields: Chemical Engineering; Radiochemistry
- Workplaces: Pacific Northwest National Laboratory, Nuclear Nonproliferation Research and Development, National Nuclear Security Administration

Novella Bridges is an African American chemical engineer, researcher, and an advocate for minorities in STEM. She was born in 1972, and is a prominent figure in the field of inorganic chemistry. It was during her high school years that Bridges was introduced to the subject which she later pursued in her career. She earned a Ph.D. from Louisiana State University and began her career at the Pacific Northwestern National Laboratory (PNNL) specializing in radiochemistry. Bridges has held roles managing projects in nuclear security, nonproliferation, and radiation detection technology for health and safety organizations. She has received numerous accolades, including being named one of the Most Distinguished Women in Chemistry/Chemical Engineering.

== Early life and education ==
Bridges was born on August 9, 1972, in Detroit, Michigan, making her the fifth child in her family. She attended Bethany Lutheran School and Lutheran High School East, where she developed a strong interest in science. Bridges' interest in science was sparked by her high school chemistry teacher (Keith Sprow), who encouraged her to pursue a career in the field. She furthered her education at Jackson State University graduating with a B.S. in chemistry, followed by Louisiana State University (LSU), earning a Ph.D. in inorganic chemistry in 2000.

== Career ==
Bridges began her career as a research scientist at the Pacific Northwest National Laboratory (PNNL) in 2001, and has spent the last 18 years providing research into several systems. She specialized in radiochemistry and heavy metal separation techniques. Some of the specific projects which Bridges focused on were hydrogen storage, cancer treatment, and a chemical catalyst for diesel fuel emissions. Bridges later transitioned to the role of project manager, overseeing various projects funded by agencies such as the National Institutes of Health (NIH), National Science Foundation (NSF), and Department of Homeland Security (DHS). She played a key role in training US Customs and Border Protection officers on the use of radiation detection equipment.

Bridges worked as a program manager in the Office of Nuclear Nonproliferation Research and Development (DNN R&D) within the National Nuclear Security Administration (NNSA). She has managed a portfolio of R&D projects focused on nuclear security by developing strategies for securing nuclear materials and preventing nuclear proliferation as well as collaborating with national laboratories and other agencies on nuclear security initiatives.

As of 2026, Bridges was appointed as member of the American Society's Committee on Chemistry and Public affairs for the 2025-2027 term. In this role, she participates in chemistry-related public affairs and policy. She continues to serve as a Senior Program Manager for the Plutonium Production Detection Portfolio within the Department of Energy's National Nuclear Security Administration, Defense Nuclear Non-Profileration Research and Development's Office of Proliferation Detection.

Personal life

Bridges is single and has no children. She is a member of the First Baptist Church in Washington, D.C., where she participates in the college prep ministry. Bridges has participated in panel discussions related to women's history and empowerment, often celebrating, mentoring, and encouraging women and minorities pursuing careers in STEM fields. In her spare time, Bridges tutors young girls who are interested in the sciences.

== Recognition and awards ==
Bridges received a graduate fellowship award from Energy Corporation during her doctoral studies at LSU. She was also named the top female athlete at Jackson State University during her senior year for the sport of tennis. She was recognized as one of the 23 Most Distinguished Women in Chemistry/Chemical Engineering during the International Year of Chemistry in 2011. She has received several awards including the PNNL Woman of Achievement Award, a GEM fellowship, and a Rising Star Award from CCG. Bridges received an award from the American Chemical Society (ACS) for the "Regional Industrial Innovation" category in 2004.
