= Tuxbury Pond =

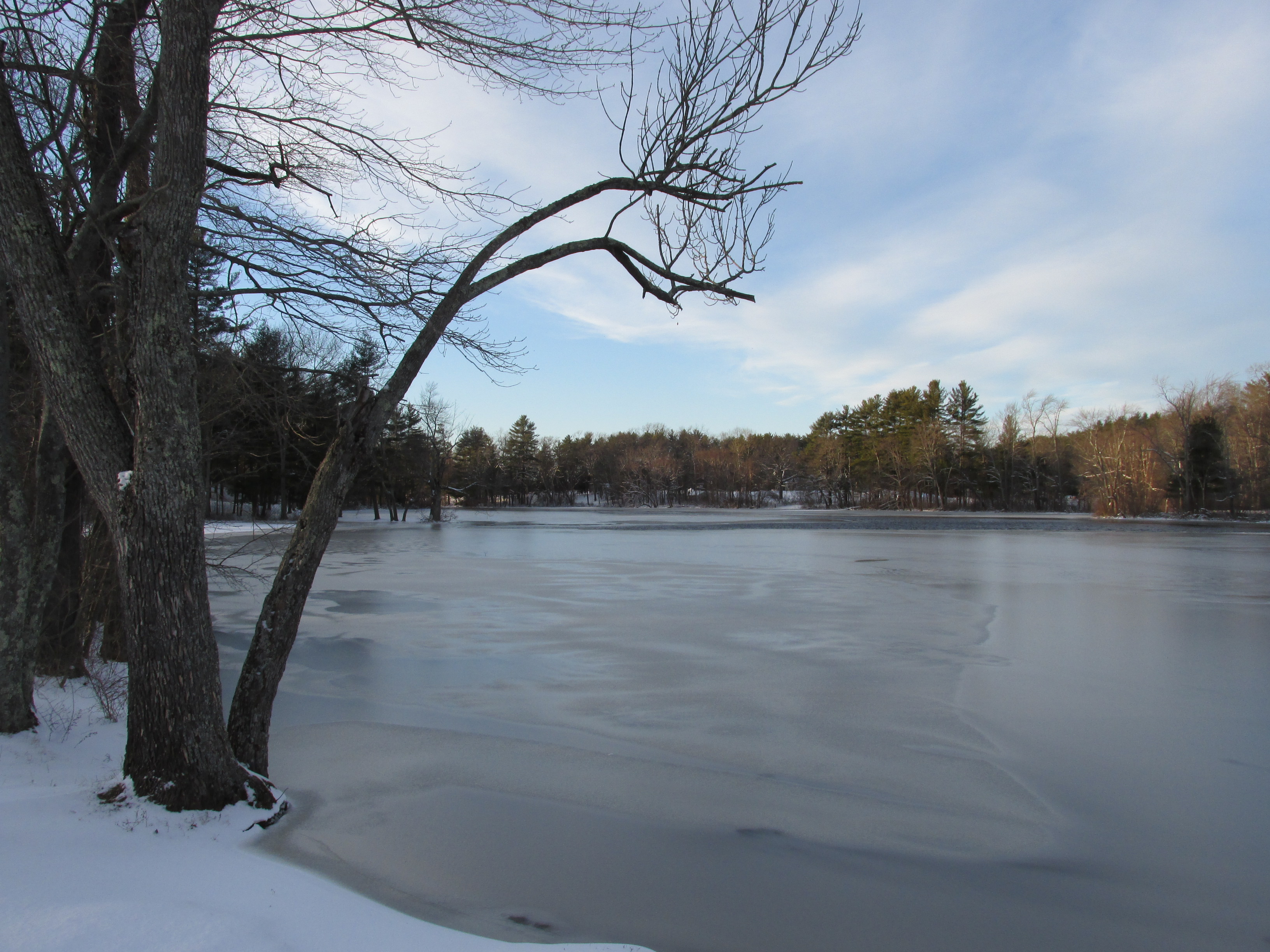
- South end of Tuxbury Pond

- Location within Massachusetts Location within New Hampshire Location within the United States
- Location: Rockingham County, New Hampshire; Essex County, Massachusetts
- Coordinates: 42°51′50″N 70°59′35″W
- Type: Reservoir
- Primary inflows: Powwow River
- Primary outflows: Powwow River
- Basin countries: United States
- Max. length: 2.1 mi (3.4 km)
- Max. width: 0.5 mi (0.80 km)
- Surface area: 119 acres (48 ha)
- Surface elevation: 95 ft (29 m)
- Islands: 2
- Settlements: South Hampton, New Hampshire; Amesbury, Massachusetts

Tuxbury Pond is a lake which straddles the Massachusetts-New Hampshire border, within the towns of Amesbury, Massachusetts and South Hampton, New Hampshire. It is located along the Powwow River. It has two islands in the middle, and a large summer camp resort lies along the Massachusetts shore.
