= Kensington Social Library =

- U.S. National Register of Historic Places
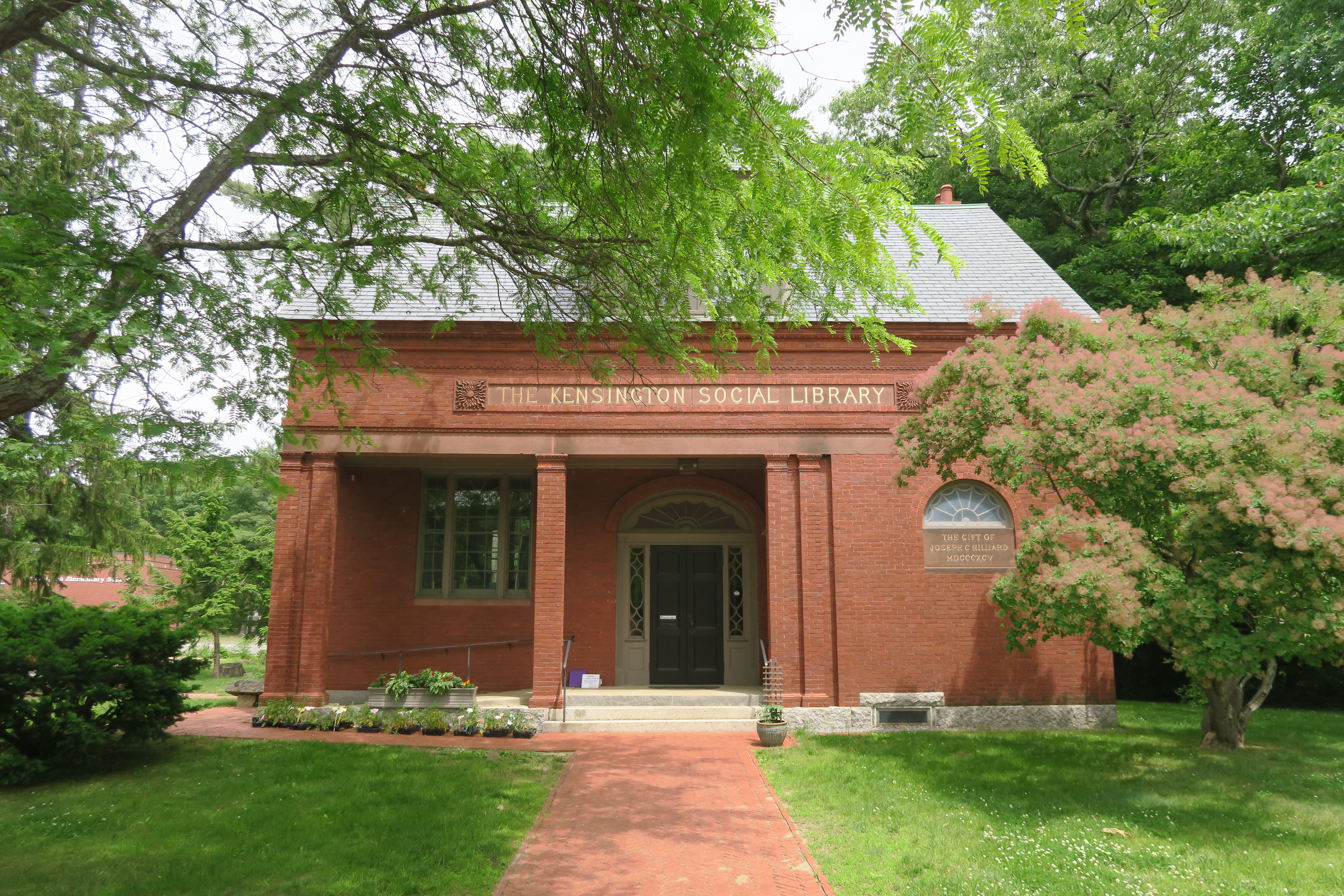

- Location within New Hampshire Location within the United States
- Location: 126 Amesbury Rd., Kensington, New Hampshire
- Coordinates: 42.9282°N 70.9435°W
- Built: 1895
- Architect: George T. Tilden
- NRHP reference No.: 100005160
- Added to NRHP: March 27, 2020

The Kensington Social Library is a historic building located at 126 Amesbury Road (New Hampshire Route 150) in Kensington, New Hampshire. The building, constructed in 1895, was listed on the National Register of Historic Places in 2020.

== See also ==
- National Register of Historic Places listings in Rockingham County, New Hampshire

== External website ==
- Official website
