= Elfrida Saunders =

British academic (1885–?)

Octavia Elfrida Saunders (born 18 October 1885) was a British academic and one of the first women to achieve a lectureship at the University of St Andrews where she lectured in German. Saunders published under the name O. Elfrida Saunders.

== Biography ==
Saunders was born in London to Herbert Clifford Saunders and Octavia Saunders (née Grimston). Her father was a barrister and was appointed to the Queen's Counsel in 1881. She was the youngest of 9 children. Her siblings included Una "Mary", Maude, Herbert "Stewart", Rose, Grace, Violet, Florence "Muriel", and Cicell Saunders.

Saunders lectured at the University of St Andrews in 1914 and 1915. In recognition of her fundamental study of English Manuscript Illumination and her donation of £4,000 to the university's Department of Art History to further the teaching and studying of art history the department hosts an eponymous lecture series in her honour.

Between 1930 and 1933, Saunders was a member of The Walpole Society, whose purpose is to study the history of British Art.

== Publications ==
=== Books ===
- Saunders, O. E. (1928). English illumination. Firenze: Pantheon.
- Saunders, O. E. (1969). A history of English art in the middle ages. New York: Books for Libraries Press.
- Saunders, O. E. (1969). English illumination: 2. New York: Hacker Art Books.

=== Reviews ===
Her publications have been reviewed in The American Magazine of Art, The Burlington Magazine for Connoisseurs, Parnassus, and The Antiquaries Journal among others.

=== Mentions ===
Saunder's publication English Illumination has been discussed in the body of several journal articles over the years including but not limited to:

- Nordström, Folke. "Peterborough, Lincoln, and the Science of Robert Grosseteste: A Study in Thirteenth Century Architecture and Iconography." The Art Bulletin 37, no. 4 (1955): 241–72.
- Breitenbach, Edgar. "The Tree of Bigamy and the Veronica Image of St. Peter's." Art Institute of Chicago Museum Studies 9 (1978): 31–38.
- Sandler, Lucy Freeman. "Illuminated in the British Isles: French Influence And/or the Englishness of English Art, 1285-1345." Gesta 45, no. 2 (2006): 177–88.
- Tiner, Elza C. "Performance Spaces in Thomas Chaundler's Liber Apologeticus." Early Theatre 18, no. 1 (2015): 33–49.
