= North School =

North School may refer to:

- North School (Kensington, New Hampshire), a one-room schoolhouse listed on the National Register of Historic Places
- North School (Portland, Maine), also listed on the NRHP
- The North School, a secondary school in Ashford, England

== See also ==
- North High School (disambiguation)
