= Powwow River =

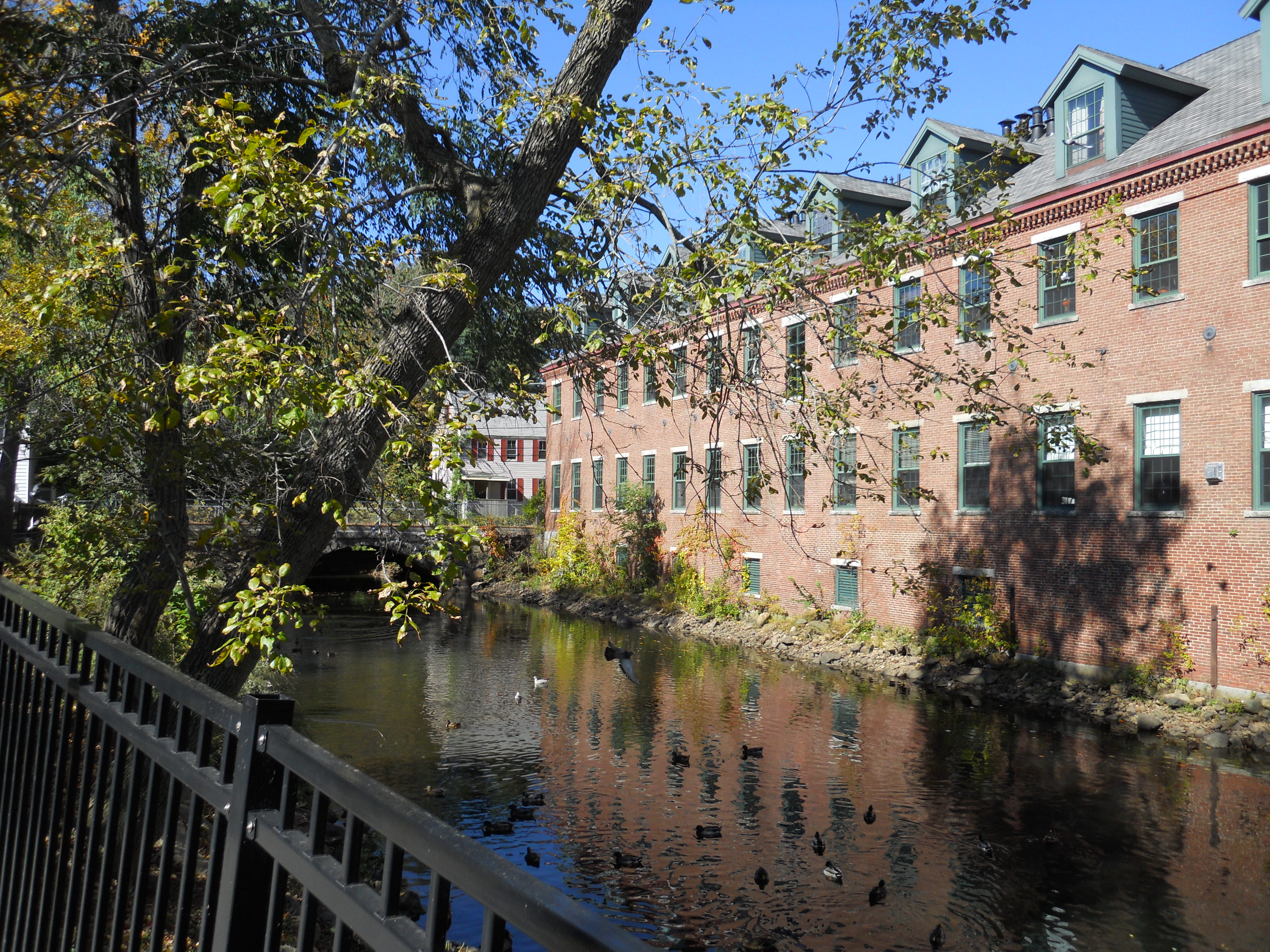
- The Powwow River in downtown Amesbury, MA

- Location within New Hampshire Location within Massachusetts Location within the United States

Location
- Country: United States
- States: New Hampshire, Massachusetts
- Counties: Rockingham, NH, Essex, MA
- Towns and city: Danville, NH, Kingston, NH, East Kingston, NH, South Hampton, NH, Amesbury, MA

Physical characteristics
- Source
  - location: Danville, NH
  - coordinates: 42°56′0″N 71°7′52″W
  - elevation: 165 ft (50 m)
- Mouth: Merrimack River
  - location: Amesbury, MA
  - coordinates: 42°50′26″N 70°55′28″W
  - elevation: 0 ft (0 m)
- Length: 22.8 mi (36.7 km)

Basin features
- Tributaries
  - left: Back River
  - right: Colby Brook

The Powwow River is a 22.8-mile-long (36.7 km) river located in New Hampshire and Massachusetts in the United States. It is a tributary of the Merrimack River, part of the Gulf of Maine watershed.

== River course ==
The Powwow River rises in the center of Danville, New Hampshire, and flows southeasterly through Long Pond into Kingston, where it enters Great Pond, a 268-acre (108 ha) water body in the center of the town. Leaving Great Pond, the river enters an extensive network of wetlands and receives a major tributary from the southwest, the outlet of Country Pond, situated in Kingston and Newton. Continuing east, the Powwow River enters Powwow Pond and passes into the southwest corner of East Kingston, flowing over Trickling Falls Dam at Route 107. The river turns southeast and enters South Hampton, where it flows into Tuxbury Pond and crosses into Amesbury, Massachusetts. Below the outlet of the pond, the river winds easterly along the state line before entering Massachusetts for good at Lake Gardner. The river then flows through the center of Amesbury, where it drops over falls and rapids before reaching the Merrimack River.

== Falls at Amesbury ==
The river drops approximately 90 feet (27 m) through the center of Amesbury, providing ample water power for the early industrial development of the town. The falls in the center of Amesbury present interesting views, with a variety of machinery, dams, and houses surrounding the falls. The river flows under a historic building in the center of the town. During flooding, the Powwow River has made national news due to the potential destruction of historic buildings in Amesbury.

== Atlantic white cedar swamp ==
Between Country Pond and Powwow Pond, the river is home to the most extensive complex of Atlantic white cedar swamp forest wetlands in New Hampshire. Atlantic white cedar swamps are a globally rare type of natural community. Of the 500,000 acres (200,000 ha) of wetlands in New Hampshire, only about 550 acres (220 ha) are Atlantic white cedar swamps.

In 2004, The Nature Conservancy purchased 50 acres (20 ha), including more than 3,000 feet (910 m) of frontage on the Powwow River and nearly all of a large Atlantic white cedar basin swamp. In 2006, The Nature Conservancy acquired four more tracts, totaling 41.8 acres (16.9 ha) and providing 1,300 feet (400 m) of river frontage, adding further protection to the swamp. The partners eventually hope to conserve a contiguous block of more than 900 acres (360 ha), safeguarding the river and its special habitats and providing opportunities for public boating, hunting, fishing and wildlife observation.

The area of the river between Country Pond and Powwow Pond is also an excellent example of a streamside fen ecosystem and is situated over one of southeastern New Hampshire's largest and most productive aquifers.

== See also ==
- List of rivers of New Hampshire
