= Brinsley Ford =

British art historian (1908–1999)

- Born: Richard Brinsley Ford; 10 June 1908; Petworth, England,
- Died: 4 May 1999 (aged 90); London, England
- Occupations: Art historian, scholar, collector
- Relatives: Richard Ford; Richard Brinsley Sheridan
- Awards: Knighted (1984)

Richard Brinsley Ford CBE (10 June 1908 – 4 May 1999) was a British art historian, scholar, and collector. He inherited a large collection of art from his family and was himself an avid collector. A drawing that he purchased in 1936 was sold by his estate for $12 million in 2000. Ford was the director of The Burlington Magazine, president of Walpole Society and chaired the Art Fund. During World War II, he was a Troop Sergeant-Major in the Royal Artillery and then served in the military intelligence organisation, MI9.

== Personal life ==
Ford was born on 10 June 1908, in Petworth, the son of Captain Richard Ford (1860–1940) and Rosamund Isabel Ramsden (1872–1911), the daughter of John William Ramsden. His father was an officer for the British Army, who inherited in 1917 a large art collection that had been assembled by his great great grandfather, Richard Ford (1758–1806) and his maternal great-grandfather, Benjamin Booth. Gustav Waagen describes the collection in Treasures of Art in Great Britain. Richard Ford, his great grandfather, wrote travel books on Spain. The Irish playwright Richard Brinsley Sheridan was an ancestor.

Ford attended Eton College. He then studied modern history at Trinity College, Oxford and graduated in 1930. In 1937 Ford married a distant cousin, Joan Mary Vyvyan who was born in 1910. The couple had one daughter and two sons. He died of a heart attack at his home in London on 4 May 1999.

== Early art collection ==
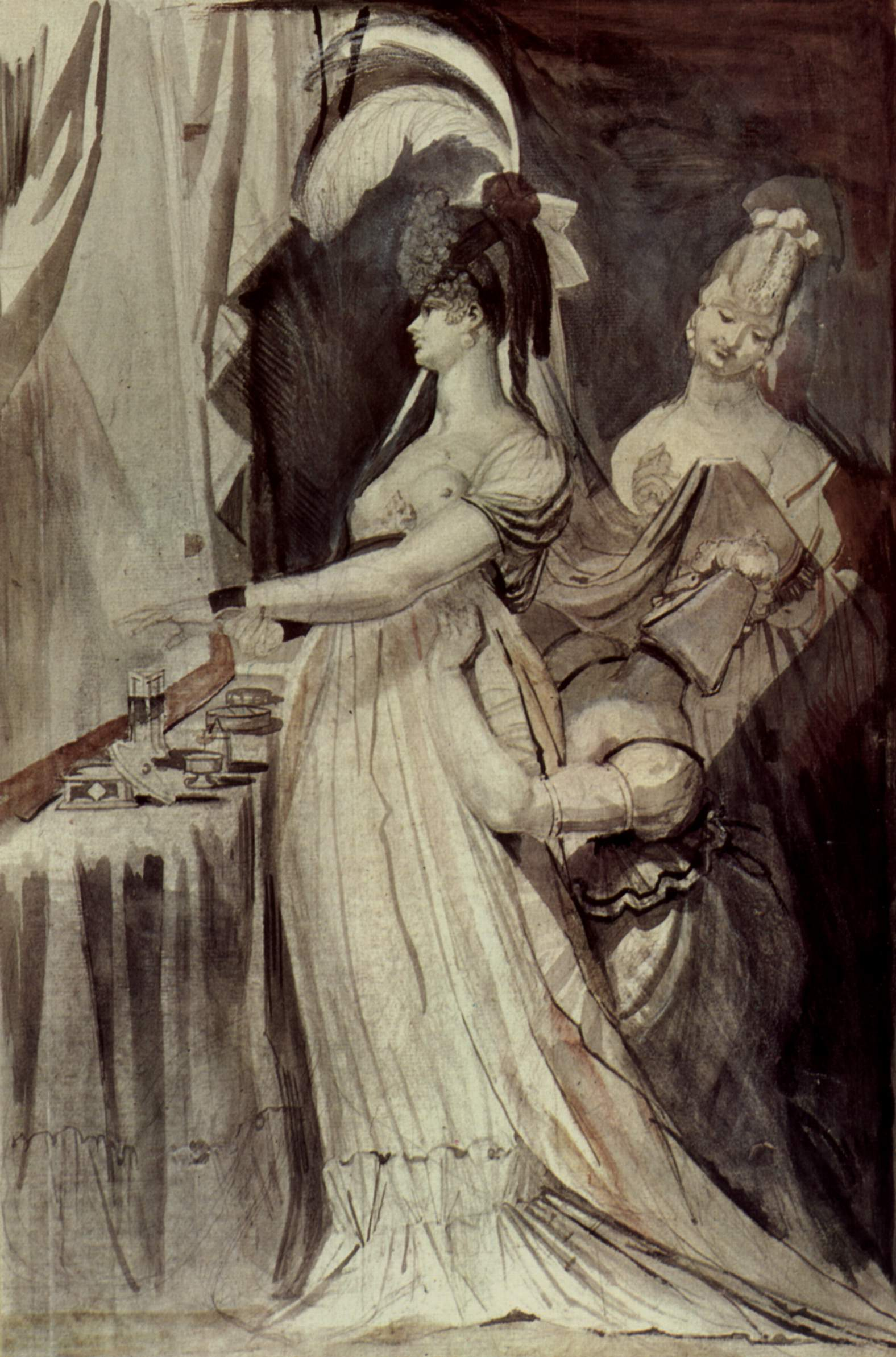
Johann Heinrich Füssli, Lady at dressing table, Brinsley Ford collection

In 1927, Ford joined the Art Fund. His maternal grandmother left him a legacy two years later with which Ford was able to begin collecting art, including the works of Henry Fuseli, Michelangelo, Ingres, Henri de Toulouse-Lautrec, and Henry Moore. He met art connoisseur James Byam Shaw and artist Charles Barrow Prescott when he joined the Burlington Fine Arts Club. In 1939 he published a scholarly article in The Burlington Magazine of portrait drawings made by Ingres. His father died in 1940 and the following year he took possession of his father's art collection.

== World War II ==
In 1939, before World War II began, Ford became Troop Sergeant-Major in the Royal Artillery of the British Army. He was transferred to MI9 military intelligence in 1941 and later headed the Brussels office.

== Career ==
Ford amassed an art collection that was held at his house at Wyndham Place. He added works by Pompeo Batoni, Cozza, and Cavallino, creating a collection of Italian seicento and settecento works. In 1951 he published The Drawings of Richard Wilson.

During the war years The Burlington Magazine floundered, but Ford rallied support and himself provided financial assistance to the journal. In its tribute to him following his death, the magazine wrote that he was "the principal engineers of this Magazine's survival in the lean years that followed World War II". In 1952 became its director. In 1954 he became a trustee of the National Gallery.

Ford became a member of the Art Fund executive committee in 1974, becoming its chair in 1975. Under his leadership more than 200 works of art were saved and National Trust properties received art work. He organised an exhibition, "Richard Ford in Spain", lent works and assisted Denys Sutton in the development of the exhibition catalog. He was chairman until 1980.

In 1984, Ford was knighted for his work. In 1986, he became the Walpole Society president, having stepped down from The Burlington Magazine. The society published a catalog of his collection in 1998.

== Dictionary of British and Irish Travellers in Italy, 1701-1800 ==
Interested in men who had made the grand tour to Italy, Ford began accumulating information for a dictionary in the 1950s. A Dictionary of British and Irish Travellers in Italy, 1701–1800, written by John Ingamells was published in 1997.

== Archive and library ==
Ford's archive on British and Irish travellers to Italy, from which the Dictionary was written, is in the Paul Mellon Centre's archive for public consultation. The archive includes research notes, correspondence, transcriptions and copies of original sources, photocopies of published material, publications and photographs. The main sequence of material is reference material in an alphabetical run of British and Irish travellers that includes artists, antiquaries, collectors and the nobility. Ford's archive also comprises material on foreign travellers and general subjects covering the arts, taste and patronage and Ford's unpublished typescript Aspects of the Grand Tour.

In 2008, the family of the late Sir Brinsley Ford donated approximately 250 exhibition catalogues on 20th-century artists and on the subject of the Grand Tour to the Paul Mellon Centre library.

== Ford art collection ==
Benjamin Booth, Ford's ancestor, began collecting works of art in the 18th century, most notably the bulk of Richard Wilson's English landscapes. It was further enhanced when Marianne, his daughter, was married to Richard Ford. Brinsley Ford added paintings, sculptures and ceramics to the collection. Works were made during the Baroque and Renaissance periods, including works of Old Masters. He has works of students of the Royal Academy of Arts that line the walls of his bedroom, from floor to ceiling. Ford enjoyed the tours he gave of the collection at his Wyndham Place house. He provided background stories about his collection, given with "the measured cadences of Edward Gibbon with the humorous sparkle of Horace Walpole" as he took visitors through rooms that held collection items.

The Brinsley Ford estate sold a drawing of what became Michelangelo's Cristo della Minerva statue, through Christie's, to a German art dealer for $12,378,500. The drawing, purchased by Ford in 1936, was used as inspiration for the statue located at the Church of Santa Maria sopra Minerva in Rome that was commissioned in 1514. It was sold for nearly $5 million more than the previous price paid for a Michelangelo work, the Woman of Camaria in 1998. In 1936, Ford was criticised for spending about 3,000 guineas for a drawing of Michelangelo's; his aunt felt it was extravagant since he paid about what it would cost for a home at that time. That story was often one of the tidbits that Ford shared on his tours with visitors.

The Walpole Society's 60th-anniversary edition was dedicated to the Ford Art Collection.

Exhibitions

A few of the exhibitions of the collection are:

- after 1951 – Drawings of Richard Wilson, loaned worldwide for exhibitions
- 1974 – "Richard Ford in Spain", shown in London and Birmingham
- 2011 – The Granary Art Gallery, Weston Park
- long term loan - 'At Home with Art – Treasures from the Brinsley Ford Collection', Basildon Park

== Published works ==
Author

- 18th Century French Paintings Drawings and Sculpture: Artemis. David Carritt Limited. 1978.
- Catalogue of an Exhibition of Pictures by Richard Wilson and His Circle Org. by the City Museum and Art Gallery, Birmingham, Jan., 1949 in the Tate Gallery, London. 1949.
- City and County of the City of Exeter. The Education Committee and Governors of the Royal Albert Memorial Museum. Exhibition of Works of Art from the Ford Collection by Courtesy of Brinsley Ford ... March 7th to April 5th, 1946 ... Catalogue. James Townsend & Sons. 1946.
- Pictures Lost to the Nation. 1986.
- Staying at Felbrigg as the Guest of Wyndham Ketton-Cremer. National Trust Year Book. 1977.
- The Ford Collection. Walpole Society. 1998.
- Richard Brinsley Ford (1977). The Society of Dilettanti: Its History.
- Three Centuries of British Water-colours and Drawings. Arts Council. 1951.

Co-author

- New Grafton Gallery (London); Sir Brinsley Ford (1986). Cherryl Fountain. New Grafton Gallery.
- Brinsley Ford; Parkin Gallery (London) (1977). Emilie Gwynne-Jones: Paintings, Water-colours and Drawings.
- Royal Academy of Arts (GB); Brinsley Ford; St. John Gore (1955). English Taste in the 18th Century from Baroque to Neo-Classic...: Winter Exhibition 1955–56, Royal Academy of Arts, London. Royal academy of arts.
- Brinsley Ford; Maas Gallery (London) (1985). Exhibition of Pastels and Watercolours by Jehan Daly and Celia Ward.
- Brinsley Ford; Royal Albert Memorial Museum (1946). Exhibition of Works of Art from the Ford Collection (by Courtesy of Brinsley Ford, Esq.): March 7th to April 5th, 1946. J. Townsend and Sons, Printers.
- Orovida Camille Pissarro; Brinsley Ford; S. Rowland Pierce, Jonathan Skelton (1960). Prince Rupert and the invention of mezzotint. University Press, for the Walpole Society.
- Brinsley Ford; Richard Ford (1 January 1974). Richard Ford in Spain: Catalogue of a Loan Exhibition in Aid of the National Art-Collections Fund 5th June-12th July, 1974 Held at Wildenstein, London. Wildenstein. ISBN 0902128159. LCCN 75315735.
- Sir Robert Sainsbury; Brinsley Ford; Burlington House Fair (London) (1979). The Burlington International Fine Art Fair (at the Royal Academy of Arts). Royal Academy of Arts (London).
- Brinsley Ford; Tessa Murdoch; Grosvenor House (1989). The Grosvenor House Antiques Fair: The Antique Dealers' Fair. Trusthouse Forte.
- Walpole Society (Great Britain); Orovida Camille Pissarro; Stephen Rowland Pierce, Brinsley Ford (1960). The Thirty-sixth Volume of the Walpole Society, 1956–1958. The Society.
