= North High School =

North High School may refer to:

- North High School (Phoenix, Arizona)
- North Pulaski High School, Jacksonville, Arkansas
- North High School (Bakersfield, California)
- John W. North High School, Riverside, California
- North High School (Torrance, California), California
- North High School (Denver, Colorado)
- North High School (Youngstown, Ohio), closed in 1980
- North Fort Myers High School, North Fort Myers, Florida
- North High School (Downers Grove, Illinois), Downers Grove, Illinois
- Lincoln-Way North High School, Frankfort Square, Illinois
- St. Charles North High School, St. Charles, Illinois
- North High School (Indiana), Evansville, Indiana
- North High School (Davenport, Iowa)
- North High School (Des Moines, Iowa)
- North High School (Sioux City, Iowa)
- Wichita North High School, Wichita, Kansas
- North Hagerstown High School, Hagerstown, Maryland
- Newton North High School, Newton, Massachusetts
- North High School (Worcester, Massachusetts)
- North Community High School, Minneapolis, Minnesota
- North High School (North St. Paul, Minnesota)
- Omaha North High School, Omaha, Nebraska
- Toms River High School North, Tom's River, New Jersey
- Williamsville North High School, Williamsville, New York
- North High School (North Dakota), Fargo, North Dakota
- North High School (Akron, Ohio)
- North High School (Columbus, Ohio)
- North High School (Eastlake, Ohio)
- North High School (Springfield, Ohio)
- Westerville North High School, Westerville, Ohio
- Edmond North High School, Edmond, Oklahoma
- North High School (Eau Claire, Wisconsin)
- Sheboygan North High School, Sheboygan, Wisconsin

== See also ==
- Northern High School (disambiguation)
- North School (disambiguation)
- High School North (disambiguation)
