= North School (Kensington, New Hampshire) =

- U.S. National Register of Historic Places
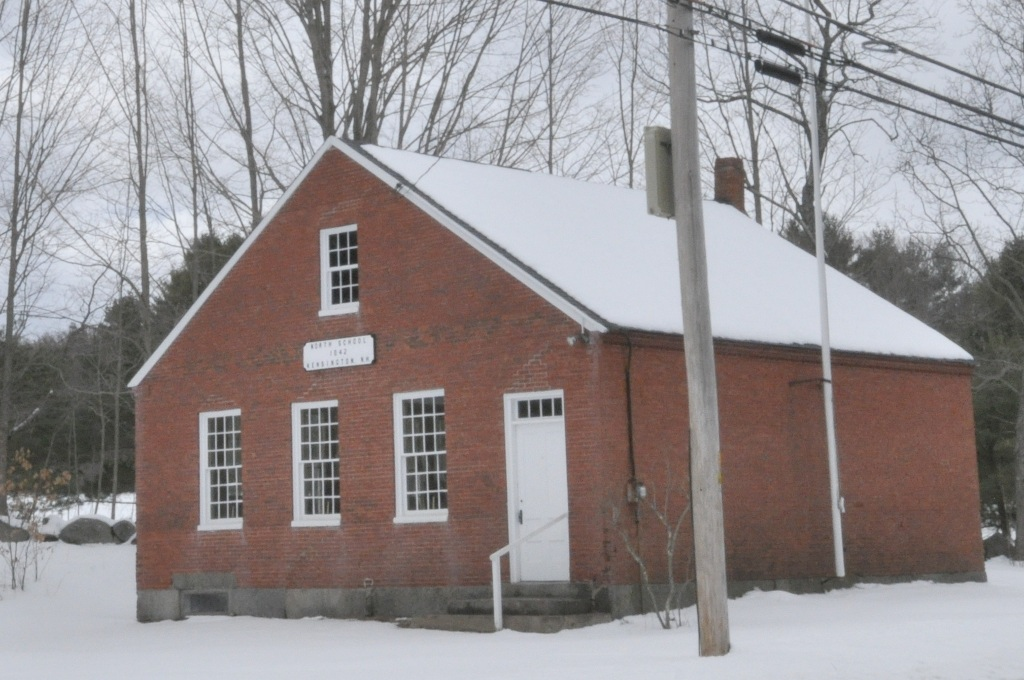

- Location within New Hampshire Location within the United States
- Location: 63 Amesbury Road, Kensington, New Hampshire
- Coordinates: 42°56′22″N 70°56′58″W
- Area: Less than one acre
- Built: 1842
- Architectural style: Greek Revival
- NRHP reference No.: 13000007
- Added to NRHP: February 13, 2013

The North School, also known locally as the Brick School, is a historic one-room schoolhouse at 63 Amesbury Street in Kensington, New Hampshire, United States. Built in 1842, it was the only brick schoolhouse built in the town, and is one of its four surviving 19th-century schools. Of those, it is the best-preserved, and is used as a local history museum. It served the town's educational purposes between 1842 and 1956, and is now a local history museum. The building was listed on the National Register of Historic Places in 2013.

== Description and history ==
The North School is located north of the small village center of Kensington, in a rural setting at the northwest corner of Amesbury Street (New Hampshire Route 150) and Moulton Ridge Road. It is a single-story gable-roofed brick building, with a small wood-frame addition to one side. Oriented facing south, its front facade is one of the gable ends, with three window bays to the left of the building entry. Windows are rectangular sash, and are set in openings that lack adornment; the entry door is topped by a four-light transom window, and there is a smaller sash window in the gable. The building interior includes a small vestibule area and a large classroom space, with outhouse facilities in the otherwise unfinished frame addition. The interior is finished with late 19th and early 20th-century finishes.

The school was built in 1842 on the site of a previous school dating to 1798. It has seen primarily modest alterations since its construction, most notably the addition of windows on its west side in 1918, the installation of the ell for toilet facilities in 1920, and the provisioning of electricity in 1938. It is maintained by the Kensington Historical Society, which was formed in 1971 to preserve it.

== See also ==
- National Register of Historic Places listings in Rockingham County, New Hampshire
