= Lutheran High School Association =

Coordinates: 42°38′25″N 83°09′12″W

The Lutheran High School Association of Greater Detroit (or simply Lutheran High School Association) is an association of several Lutheran high schools in Metro Detroit, Michigan. It has a unified standards-based curriculum. Currently its component high schools are Lutheran High School North, Lutheran High School Westland, and Lutheran High School Northwest. The Lutheran High School Association administrative office relocated to an addition at Lutheran Northwest in 2006.

== List of schools ==
School	Location	Founded	Ref.
Lutheran High School North	Macomb Township	1972	
Lutheran High School Northwest	Rochester Hills	1978	
Lutheran High School Westland	Westland	1986	

=== Former ===
School	Location	Founded	Closed	Ref.
Detroit Lutheran High School	Detroit	1944	1957	
Lutheran High School East	Harper Woods	1957	2004	
Lutheran High School South	Newport	1999	2016	
Lutheran High School West	Detroit	1957	1995	
