= Jane Dowling =

British artist (1925–2023)

- Born: 6 December 1925
- Died: 6 February 2023
- Occupation: Painter

Irene Mary Dowling (6 December 1925 – 6 February 2023), better known as Jane Dowling, was a British artist.

== Biography ==
Dowling was born in London and while studying for a degree at St Anne's College, Oxford between 1943 and 1946, she also studied at the Slade School of Fine Art which during World War 2 evacuated from London to the Ashmolean Museum in Oxford. Between 1946 and 1963 she took further courses at the Ruskin School of Art, the Byam Shaw School of Art and the Central School of Arts and Crafts in London. Dowling went on to teach at the Byam Shaw School, Maidstone School of Art and at the Royal Academy Schools. Beginning in 1961 she became a regular exhibitor at the Royal Academy, including at the 2019 Summer Exhibition, and from 1974 onwards she had a series of solo shows at the New Grafton Gallery in London and also exhibited with the New English Art Club. During 1984 and 1985, Dowling and her husband, the portrait painter Peter Greenham (1909–1992) had a joint touring exhibition. A retrospective exhibition of her work was held at the Mompesson House in Salisbury in 1992 and further solo shows followed, notably at the Chappel Galleries in 2002.

Dowling was elected a member of the Art Workers' Guild in 1980, became an honorary member of the Royal Society of British Artists in 1997 and a member of the Society of Tempera Painters in 1999. Dowling completed a number of commissions for the National Trust and also one for the Oxford Oratory Church. Several Oxford hospitals, plus the town's Ashmolean Museum and also Southampton Art Gallery hold examples of her work.

Dowling died on 6 February 2023, at the age of 97.
