= Union Meetinghouse-Universalist Church =

Historic church in New Hampshire, United States

- U.S. National Register of Historic Places
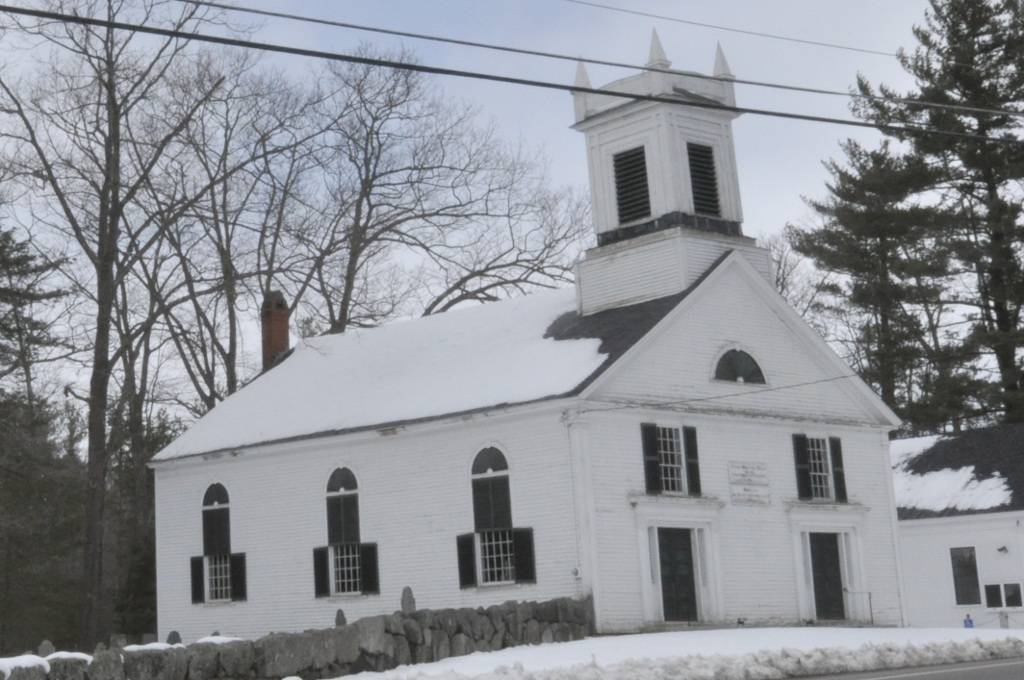

- Location within New Hampshire Location within the United States
- Location: 97 Amesbury Rd., Kensington, New Hampshire
- Coordinates: 42°55′53″N 70°56′43″W
- Area: Less than one acre
- Built: 1839-40
- Architectural style: Greek Revival
- NRHP reference No.: 13000008
- Added to NRHP: February 13, 2013

The Union Meetinghouse or Universalist Church is a historic church building at 97 Amesbury Road in Kensington, New Hampshire. Built in 1839–40, it is a well-preserved and little-altered example of a mid-19th century Greek Revival rural church. It was listed on the National Register of Historic Places in 2013, and continues to be used for summer services.

== Description and history ==
The Union Meetinghouse stands at the southern end of a cluster of civic and municipal buildings that constitute the town center of Kensington, at the junction of Amesbury and Osgood Roads. It is a single-story wood-frame structure, with a gabled roof and clapboarded exterior. Its main facade has a pedimented gable and a pair of doorways, each flanked by sidelight windows and topped by an entablature. The church tower has two stages, and is topped by Gothic pinnacles at the corners (a later addition). The building has seen only relatively minor alterations since its construction. The interior retains its original as-built configuration, with original pulpit and fixtures.

The single story Greek Revival white clapboard structure was largely completed in 1839 and formally dedicated in 1840. It was originally built to serve as a meetinghouse shared by several Protestant congregations, partly the result of splits within the dominant Congregationalists, and partly due to the rising number of Baptists and Quakers in the community. By 1865 many of these congregations had either folded or established their own buildings, leaving the building to the large Universalist congregation. The town formally deeded the underlying land to the Universalist Society in 1915.

The Meetinghouse underwent a major restoration in 2024, including addition of new structural elements to support the weight of the belfry, jacking the belfry to level, a full roof replacement, re-sheathing and coppering of the belfry deck and roof, exterior siding and trim repair and painting, and replacement of a previous plaster patch in the sanctuary dated from the 1940s, at a cost of over $650,000.

== See also ==
- National Register of Historic Places listings in Rockingham County, New Hampshire
