= Country Pond =

Lake in the U.S. state of New Hampshire

- Location within New Hampshire Location within the United States
- Location: Rockingham County, New Hampshire
- Coordinates: 42°53′18″N 71°03′43″W
- Primary inflows: Colby Brook
- Primary outflows: Powwow River
- Basin countries: United States
- Max. length: 1.3 mi (2.1 km)
- Max. width: 0.9 mi (1.4 km)
- Surface area: 306 acres (1.2 km^{2})
- Average depth: 16 ft (4.9 m)
- Max. depth: 25 ft (7.6 m)
- Surface elevation: 116 ft (35 m)
- Islands: 1
- Settlements: Kingston; Newton

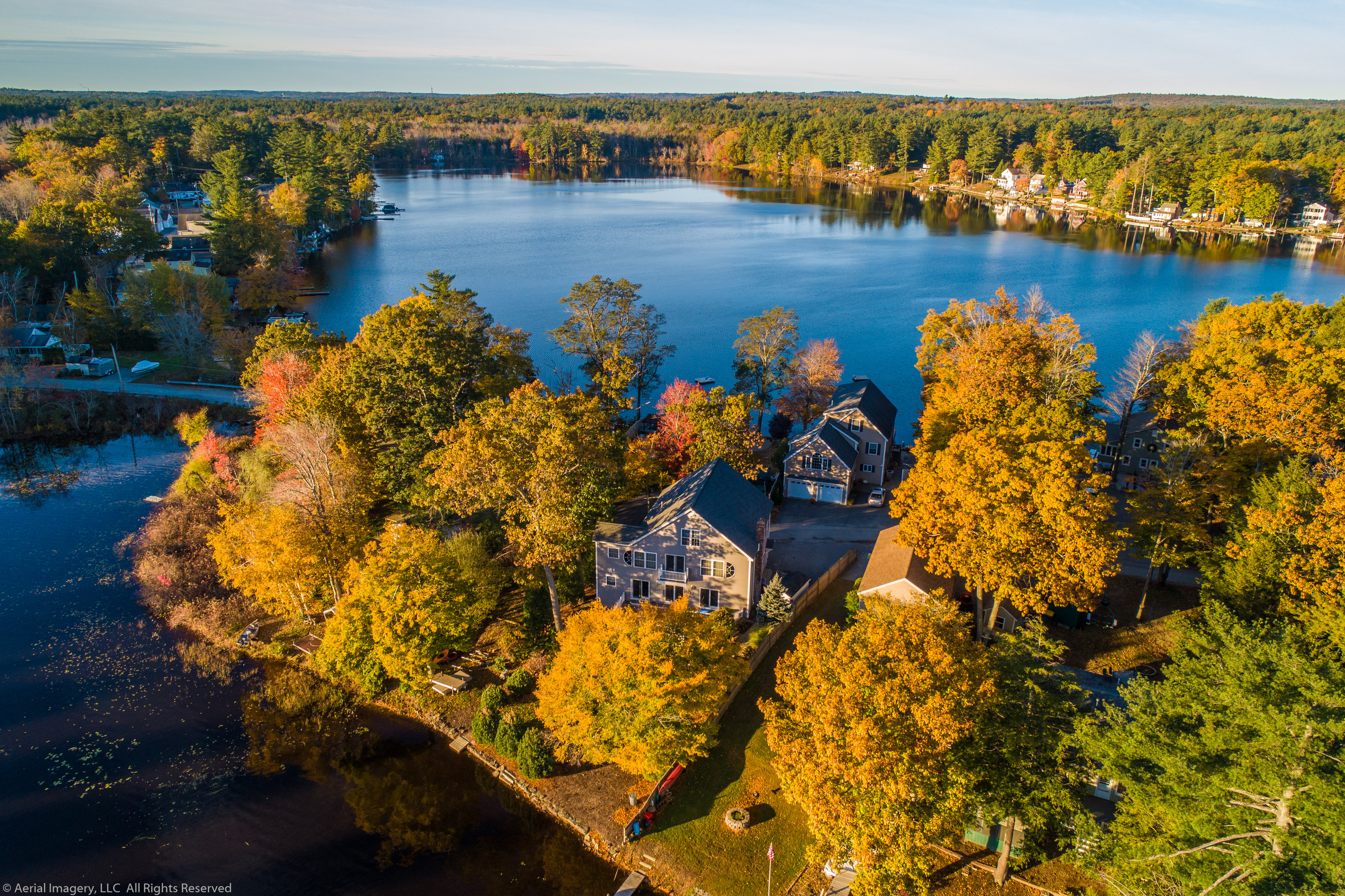
Country Pond October 2018

Country Pond is a 306-acre (124 ha) water body located in Rockingham County in southern New Hampshire, United States, in the towns of Kingston and Newton. Water from Country Pond flows via the Powwow River to the Merrimack River in Amesbury, Massachusetts.

The lake is classified as a warmwater fishery, with observed species including smallmouth bass, largemouth bass, chain pickerel, brown bullhead, black crappie, white perch, American eel, bluegill, white sucker, and pumpkinseed.

== See also ==
- List of lakes in New Hampshire
