= Powwow Pond =

Body of water in Rockingham County, New Hampshire, US

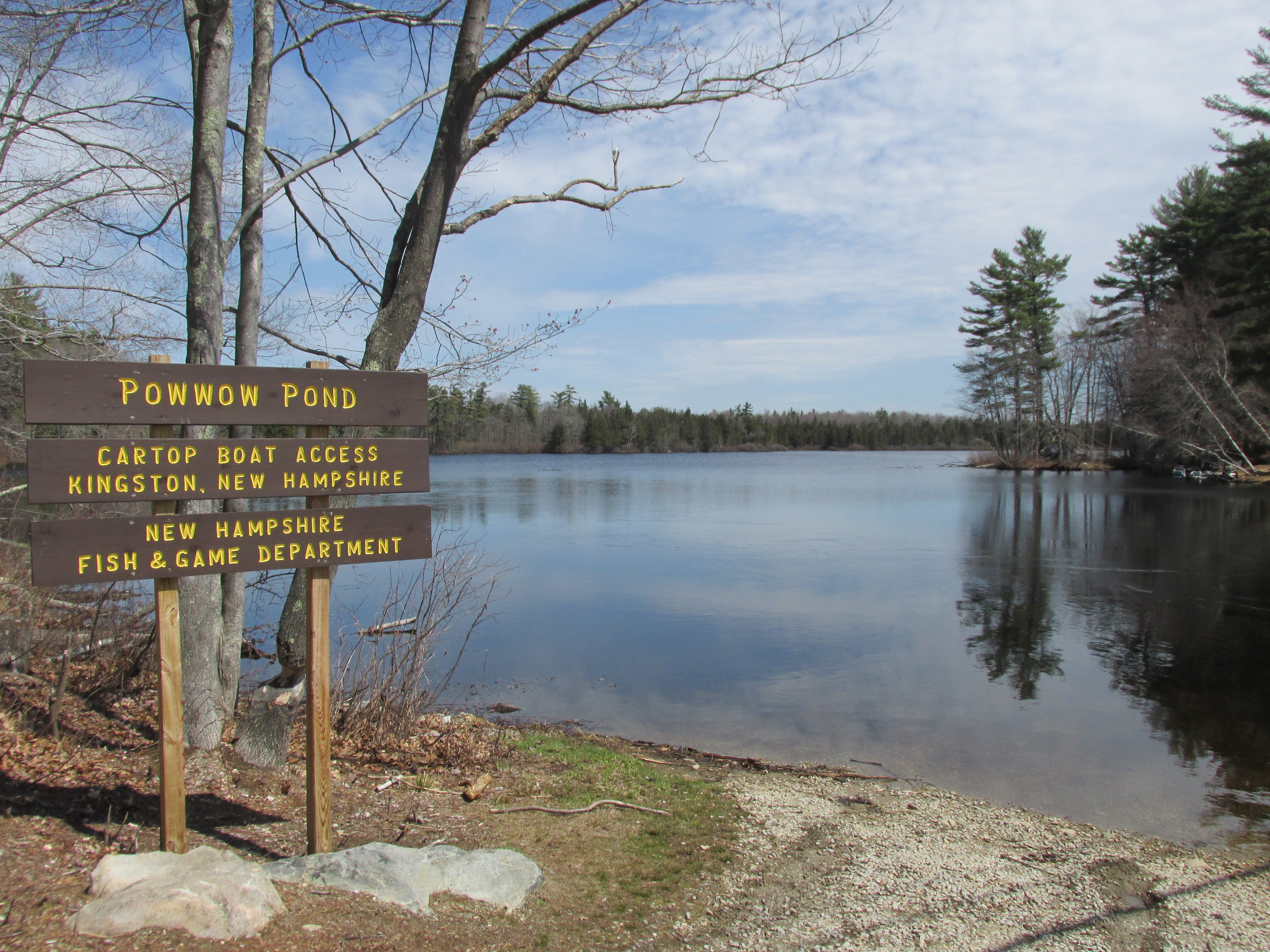

- Location within New Hampshire Location within the United States
- Location: Rockingham County, New Hampshire
- Coordinates: 42°54′51″N 71°2′8″W
- Primary inflows: Powwow River
- Primary outflows: Powwow River
- Basin countries: United States
- Max. length: 1.8 mi (2.9 km)
- Max. width: 0.9 mi (1.4 km)
- Surface area: 348 acres (1.41 km^{2})
- Average depth: 4 ft (1.2 m)
- Max. depth: 11 ft (3.4 m)
- Surface elevation: 116 ft (35 m)
- Settlements: Kingston; East Kingston

Powwow Pond is a 348-acre (1.41 km^{2}) water body in Rockingham County in southeastern New Hampshire, United States. It is classified as an artificial impoundment. The outlet of the pond is located in the town of East Kingston, but most of the lake lies in the town of Kingston. The Powwow River, the outlet of the pond, flows to the Merrimack River in Amesbury, Massachusetts.

The lake is classified as a warmwater fishery, with observed species including smallmouth and largemouth bass, chain pickerel, horned pout, and black crappie.

== See also ==
- List of lakes in New Hampshire
