= Lutheran High School Westland =

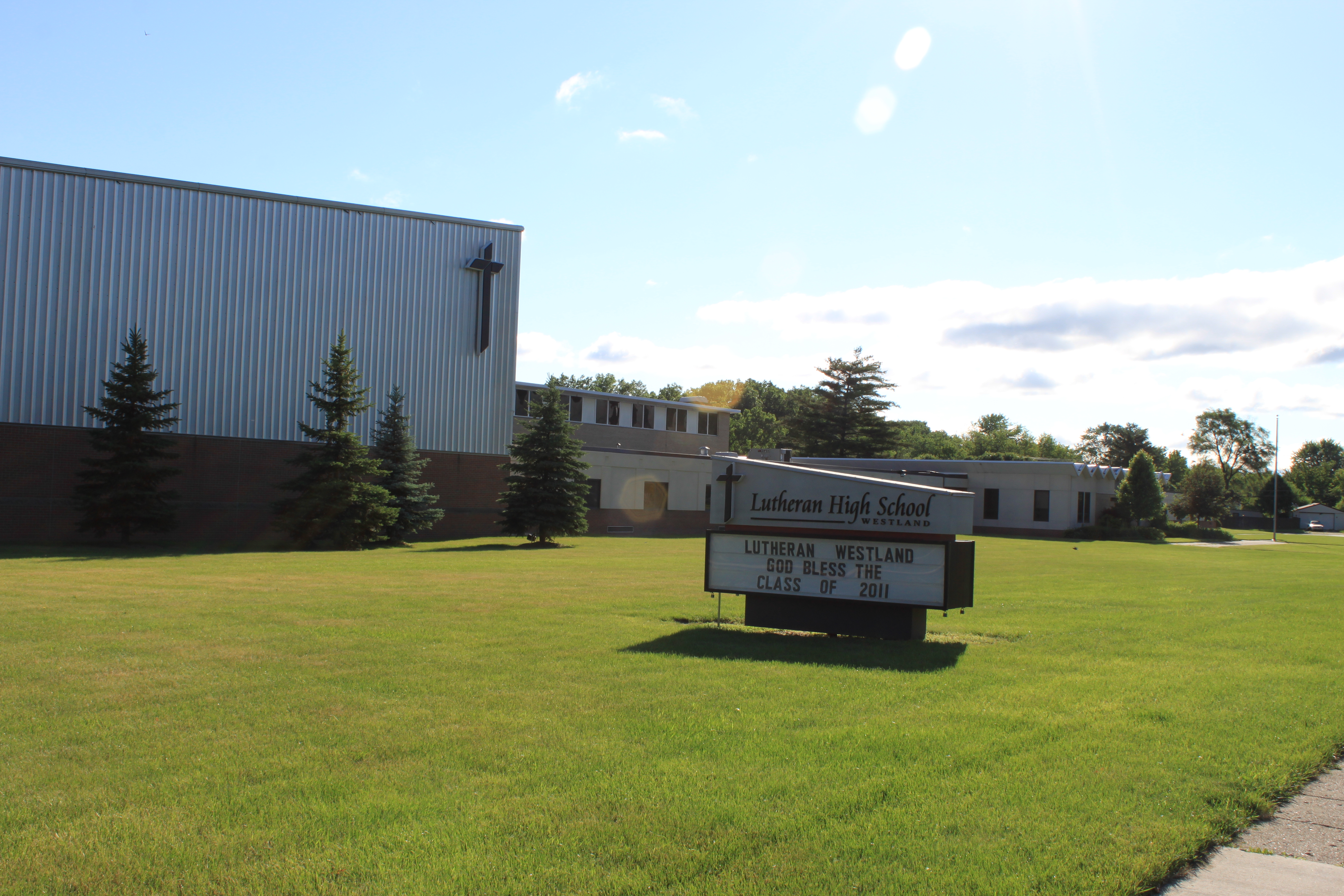

Location
- Westland, Michigan; United States; 42°20′37″N 83°22′20″W

Information
- Type: Parochial school
- Established: 1986
- Teaching staff: 8.8 (on an FTE basis)
- Grades: 9–12
- Enrollment: 90 (2017-18)
- Student to teacher ratio: 10.2
- Colors: Black and white
- Athletics conference: Michigan Independent Athletic Conference
- Mascot: Warrior
- Affiliation: Lutheran Church – Missouri Synod
- Website: Lutheran H.S.

Lutheran High School Westland is a parochial high school located in Westland, Michigan, in Wayne County. It is governed by the Lutheran High School Association of Greater Detroit and is associated with the Lutheran Church – Missouri Synod. Its current enrollment is about 190 students. The school colors are black and white, and its mascot is the Warrior.

== History ==
Talks began in the mid-1980s to open another Lutheran high school in western Wayne County. As enrollment declined at Lutheran High School East in Harper Woods and Lutheran High School West in Detroit, Westland was selected as the site for the new school.

== Building history ==
The school opened in 1986 in the building that was formerly Nankin Mills Middle School, where singer Alice Cooper had attended.
