= Greeley House (East Kingston, New Hampshire) =

Historic house in New Hampshire, United States

- U.S. National Register of Historic Places
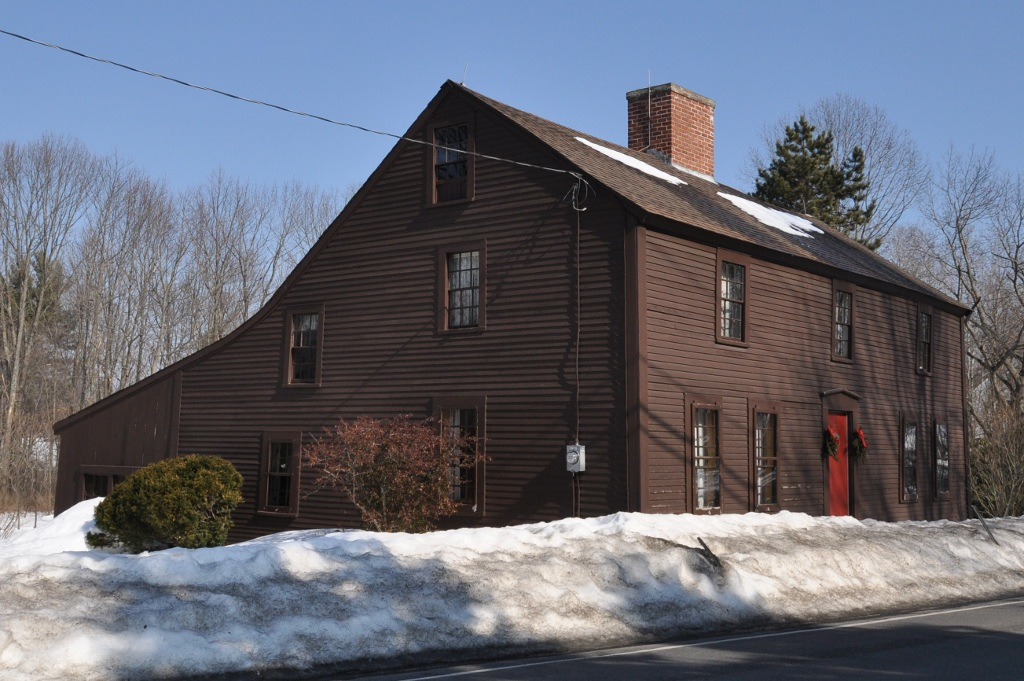

- Location within New Hampshire Location within the United States
- Location: NH 108, East Kingston, New Hampshire
- Coordinates: 42°55′18″N 70°59′43″W
- Area: 6.9 acres (2.8 ha)
- Built: 1718
- Built by: Greeley, Joseph
- Architectural style: Georgian
- NRHP reference No.: 80000300
- Added to NRHP: June 16, 1980

The Greeley House is a historic First Period house on New Hampshire Route 108, east of the center of East Kingston, New Hampshire. Built about 1718, it is one of the community's oldest surviving buildings, and a distinctive and visible reminder of its largely agrarian past. The house was listed on the National Register of Historic Places in 1980.

== Description and history ==
The Greeley House is located on the north side of New Hampshire Route 108, just a few feet from the roadway, at a point where it bends, mainly to avoid the house. It is a 2½-story wood-frame structure, with a gabled roof, central chimney, and clapboarded exterior. Its main facade is five bays wide on the first floor and three on the second. The entrance is at the center, framed by a modest surround with a peaked lintel. The rear roof line extends to the first floor, giving the house a saltbox profile, and there is a shed-roof addition on the east side which was added in the 1960s. A gabled dormer projects from the rear roof face.

The house is believed to have been built in 1718 by Joseph Greeley. Its prominent location along the major east–west route through the town (between Kingston and Seabrook) has made it a landmark in the town for many years.

== See also ==
- National Register of Historic Places listings in Rockingham County, New Hampshire
