= Northern High School =

Northern High School may refer to:

- Northern High School (Baltimore, Maryland), defunct
- Northern High School (Owings, Maryland)
- Northern High School (Detroit, Michigan)
- Northern High School (Durham, North Carolina)
- Northern High School (Dillsburg, Pennsylvania)
- Northern Collegiate Institute and Vocational School, Sarnia, Ontario

== See also ==
- North High School (disambiguation)
