= Dr. Paul W. and Eunice Greeley House =

Historic house in Illinois, United States

- U.S. National Register of Historic Places
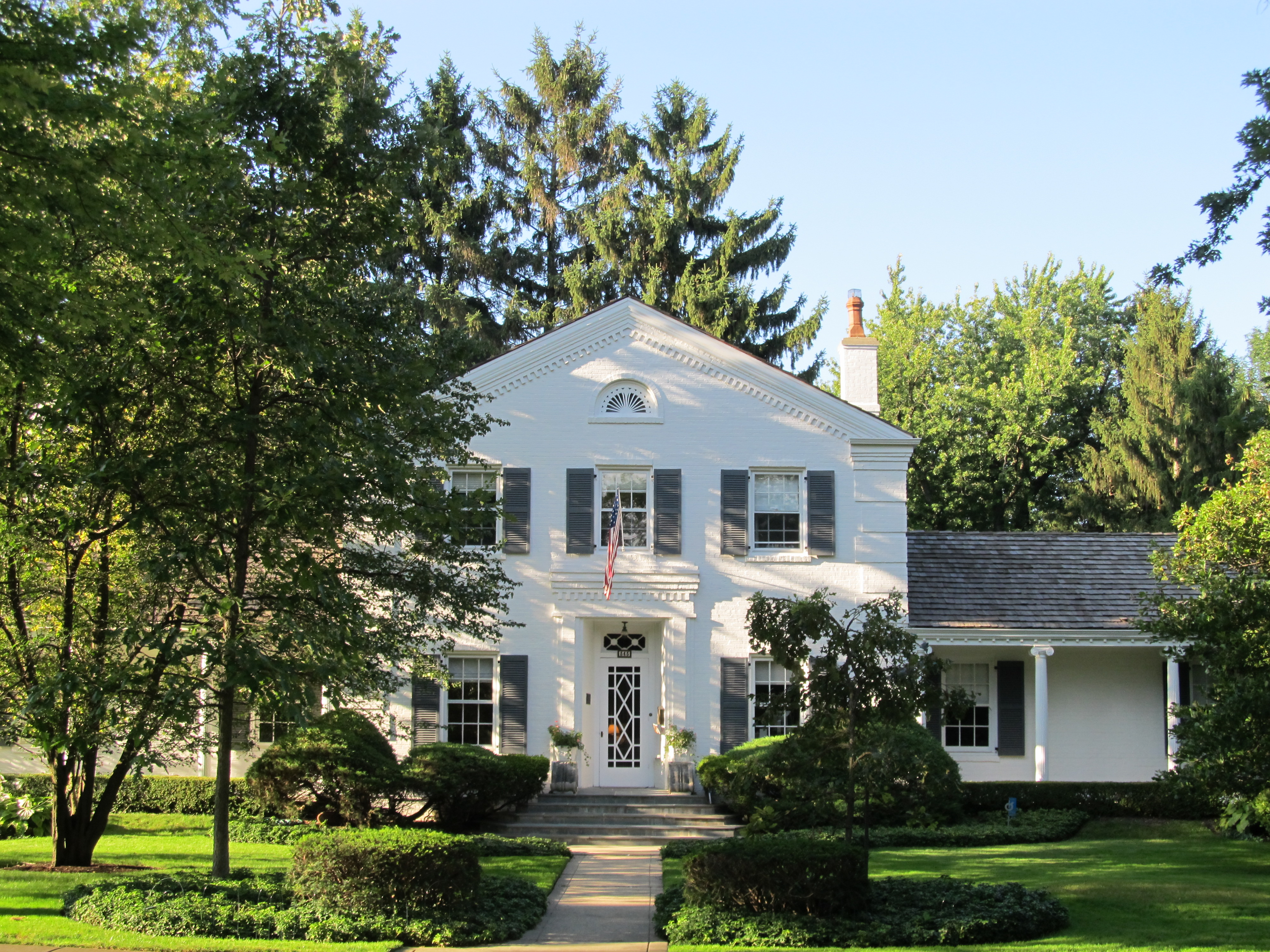

- Location within Illinois Location within the United States
- Location: 545 Oak St., Winnetka, Illinois
- Coordinates: 42°6′17″N 87°43′31″W
- Built: 1937
- Architect: Frank Polito
- Architectural style: Classical Revival, Greek Revival
- NRHP reference No.: 11000048
- Added to NRHP: February 25, 2011

The Dr. Paul W. and Eunice Greeley House is a historic residence in Winnetka, Illinois. Dr. Greeley was a major figure in the field of plastic surgery around World War II and later served as department chair at two universities. Designed by Frank Polito, and with a dining room probably designed by Fiske Kimball, the Classical Revival residence closely follows a Greek Revival design and was listed on the National Register of Historic Places in 2011.

== History ==
Paul W. Greeley, Jr. was born on July 10, 1902, in Waterman, Illinois. He grew up in DeKalb County, where his father began practicing medicine in 1905. Eunice Goebel was born in Palo Alto, California on April 9, 1904. She was the daughter of Julius Goebel, a prominent Germanic language scholar at Stanford University and co-founder of the Modern Language Association. Paul Greeley and Eunice Goebel wed in 1927 shortly after Greeley graduated from Northwestern University Medical School in Evanston, Illinois. By 1930, the couple were living in nearby Winnetka. Eunice became involved with local affairs, serving as Executive of the Winnetka Garden Club. In 1937, Dr. Greeley was named Professor and Chief of the Division of Plastic Surgery at the University of Illinois College of Medicine.

Dr. Greeley received further training in Europe and enlisted as a Lt. Commander in the United States Naval Reserve Medical Corps in 1943. His skills were in high demand, as he was one of only two hundred plastic surgeons in the United States. Within the year, he was named Chief of Plastic Surgery at Naval Hospital Oakland in California. He served at the hospital until 1946, subsequently receiving a commendation from the Secretary of the Navy.

In 1957, he was named Professor of Surgery and Chairman of the Department of Plastic and Reconstructive Surgery at Rush Medical College. He was promoted to Rear Admiral of the Naval Reserve Medical Corps in 1961. They sold their Winnetka residence in the same year. Greeley retired in 1972 and moved with Eunice to La Jolla, California. Eunice died on June 4, 1978, and Dr. Greeley died on September 21, 1985. By the time of his death, Dr. Greeley had over 125 publications to his name on plastic and reconstructive surgery.

Although officially considered a Classical Revival house because of its era of construction, the plan for the residence closely resembles the Greek Revival style. The house closely resembles its original 1937 appearance. It is believed that Eunice's brother-in-law Fiske Kimball designed the dining room. The only significant change to its construction was the closing-in of the rear screen porch in 1974. On February 25, 2011, the house was recognized by the National Park Service with a listing on the National Register of Historic Places.
