= Cozza =

Cozza is a surname of Italian origin. Notable people with the surname include:

- Carlo Cozza (c. 1700–1769), Italian painter
- Carmen Cozza (1930–2018), American football and baseball coach
- Cataldo Cozza (born 1985), Italian-German footballer
- Francesco Cozza (footballer) (born 1974), Italian footballer and manager
- Francesco Cozza (painter) (1605–1682), Italian painter
- Giuseppe Cozza-Luzi (1837–1905), Italian savant and abbot
- Liberale Cozza (1768–1821), Italian painter
- Lorenzo Cozza (1654–1729), Italian Roman Catholic cardinal, Franciscan friar, and theologian
- Lucos Cozza (1921–2011), Italian archaeologist
- Mathieu Cozza (born 2002), French rugby league footballer
- Nicolas Cozza (born 1999), French footballer
- Steven Cozza (born 1985), American road bicycle racer
