= Kensington, New Hampshire =

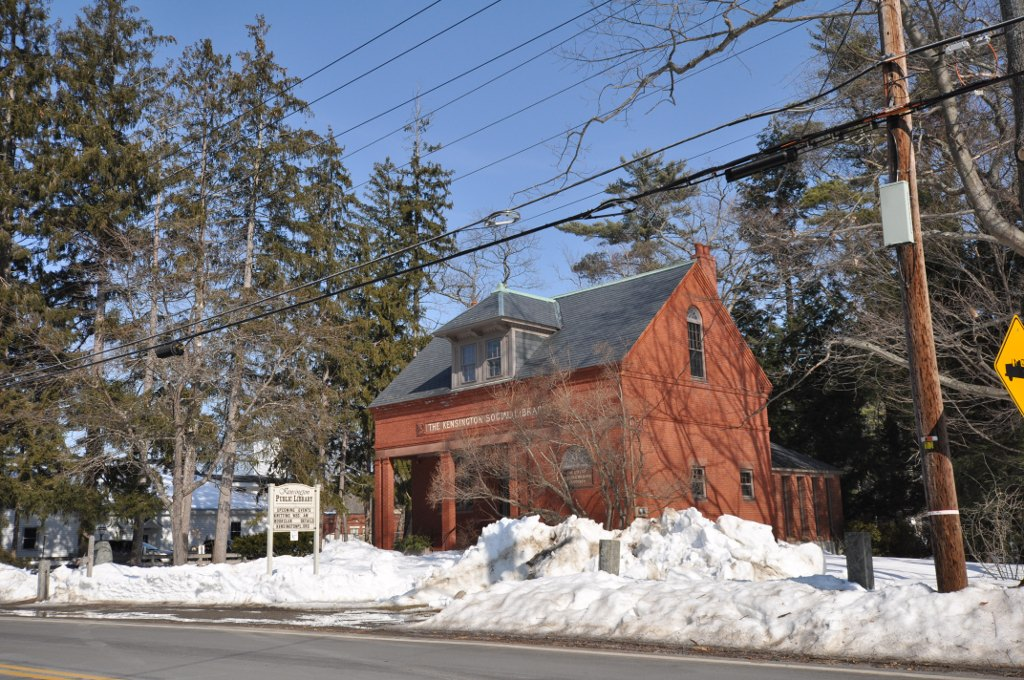
- The public library, listed on the National Register of Historic Places

- Seal

- Location in Rockingham County and the state of New Hampshire.
- Coordinates: 42°55′43″N 70°57′00″W
- Country: United States
- State: New Hampshire
- County: Rockingham
- Incorporated: 1737

Area
  - Total: 11.98 sq mi (31.03 km^{2})
  - Land: 11.97 sq mi (30.99 km^{2})
  - Water: 0.015 sq mi (0.04 km^{2}) 0.12%
- Elevation: 108 ft (33 m)

Population (2020)
  - Total: 2,095
  - Density: 175/sq mi (67.6/km^{2})
- Time zone: UTC-5 (Eastern)
  - Summer (DST): UTC-4 (Eastern)
- ZIP code: 03833
- Area code: 603
- FIPS code: 33-39780
- GNIS feature ID: 873636
- Website: www.kensingtonnh.gov

Kensington is a town in Rockingham County, New Hampshire, United States. The population was 2,095 at the 2020 census.

== History ==
Once a parish of Hampton, Kensington was incorporated in 1737 by New Hampshire governor Jonathan Belcher. Of the 27 towns granted by Governor Belcher, only three were given names, one of which was Kensington, named for Baron Kensington, owner of Kensington Palace in London.

== Geography ==
According to the United States Census Bureau, the town has a total area of 12.0 square miles (31.0 km^{2}), of which 0.02 square miles (0.04 km^{2}) are water, comprising 0.12% of the town. Kensington is home to 16 named hills of glacial drumlin origin; the highest, Indian Ground Hill, located on the town's border with South Hampton, is 305 feet (93 m) above sea level. The majority of Kensington lies within the Piscataqua River watershed, via the Exeter River. The southeast portion of town drains to Hampton Harbor via the Taylor and Hampton Falls rivers, and the southwest corner of the town drains to the Merrimack River.

=== Adjacent municipalities ===
- Exeter (north)
- Hampton Falls (east)
- Seabrook (southeast)
- South Hampton (south)
- East Kingston (west)

== Demographics ==
Historical population
Census	Pop.	Note	%±
1790	800		—
1800	776		−3.0%
1810	781		0.6%
1820	709		−9.2%
1830	717		1.1%
1840	647		−9.8%
1850	700		8.2%
1860	672		−4.0%
1870	642		−4.5%
1880	614		−4.4%
1890	547		−10.9%
1900	524		−4.2%
1910	417		−20.4%
1920	383		−8.2%
1930	438		14.4%
1940	458		4.6%
1950	542		18.3%
1960	708		30.6%
1970	1,044		47.5%
1980	1,322		26.6%
1990	1,631		23.4%
2000	1,893		16.1%
2010	2,124		12.2%
2020	2,095		−1.4%
U.S. Decennial Census

As of the census of 2000, there were 1,893 people, 657 households, and 532 families residing in the town. The population density was 158.4 inhabitants per square mile (61.2/km^{2}). There were 672 housing units at an average density of 56.2 per square mile (21.7/km^{2}). The racial makeup of the town was 98.31% White, 0.11% African American, 0.21% Native American, 0.63% Asian, and 0.74% from two or more races.

There were 657 households, out of which 40.3% had children under the age of 18 living with them, 72.9% were married couples living together, 5.8% had a female householder with no husband present, and 18.9% were non-families. 13.4% of all households were made up of individuals, and 4.9% had someone living alone who was 65 years of age or older. The average household size was 2.88 and the average family size was 3.18.

In the town, the population was spread out, with 27.8% under the age of 18, 5.0% from 18 to 24, 32.0% from 25 to 44, 25.4% from 45 to 64, and 9.8% who were 65 years of age or older. The median age was 39 years. For every 100 females, there were 97.6 males. For every 100 females age 18 and over, there were 100.0 males.

The median income for a household in the town was $67,344, and the median income for a family was $72,679. Males had a median income of $56,023 versus $35,278 for females. The per capita income for the town was $29,265. About 3.4% of families and 4.6% of the population were below the poverty line, including 5.1% of those under age 18 and 4.6% of those age 65 or over.

== Notable people ==
- Dan Dailey (born 1947), glass artist
- Hideaki Miyamura (born 1955), studio potter
- Roland D. Sawyer (1874–1979), Christian Socialist minister and state legislator

== Sites of interest ==
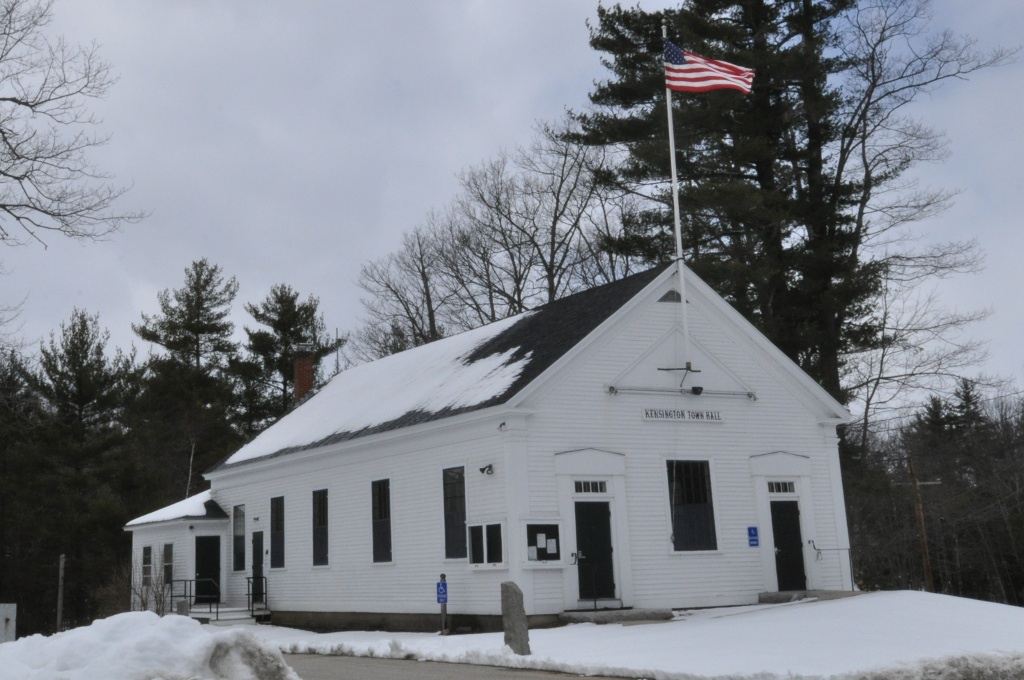
Kensington Town House

The town has four buildings, each on Amesbury Road (New Hampshire Route 150), listed on the National Register of Historic Places:

- Kensington Social Library
- Kensington Town House
- North School, also known locally as the Brick School
- Union Meetinghouse-Universalist Church
