= East Kingston, New Hampshire =

Place in New Hampshire, United States

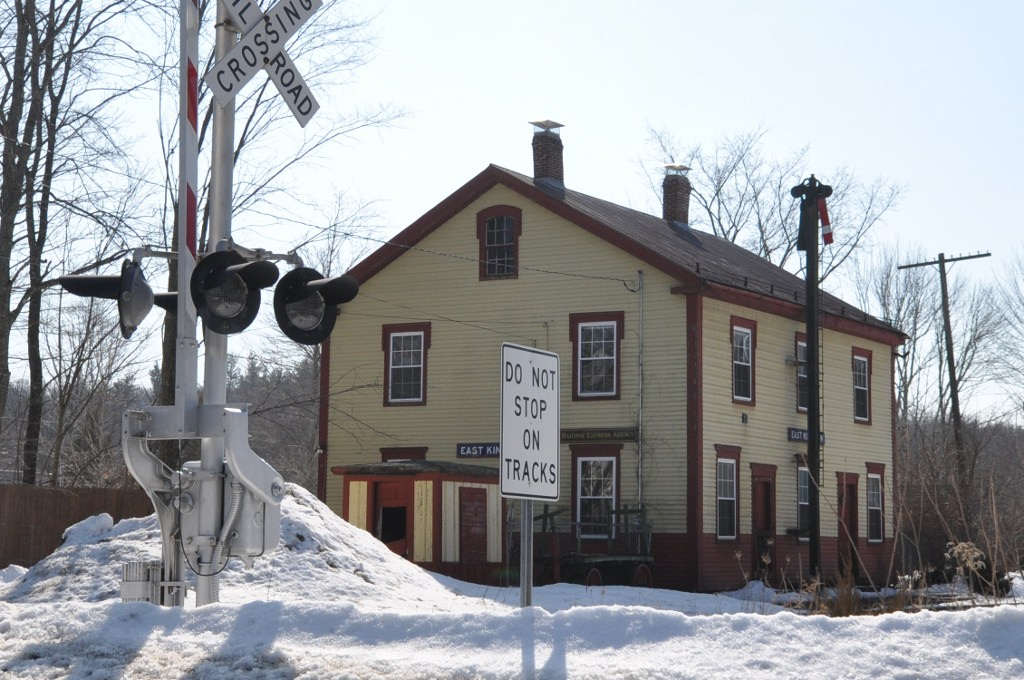
- The former railroad station

- Seal

- Location in Rockingham County and the state of New Hampshire.
- Coordinates: 42°55′32″N 71°01′0″W
- Country: United States
- State: New Hampshire
- County: Rockingham
- Incorporated: 1738
- Villages: East Kingston; Monahan Corner; Powwow River

Area
  - Total: 9.97 sq mi (25.83 km^{2})
  - Land: 9.92 sq mi (25.68 km^{2})
  - Water: 0.058 sq mi (0.15 km^{2}) 0.56%
- Elevation: 108 ft (33 m)

Population (2020)
  - Total: 2,441
  - Density: 250/sq mi (95/km^{2})
- Time zone: UTC-5 (Eastern)
  - Summer (DST): UTC-4 (Eastern)
- ZIP code: 03827
- Area code: 603
- FIPS code: 33-21380
- GNIS feature ID: 873585
- Website: www.eknh.org

East Kingston is a town in Rockingham County, New Hampshire, United States. The population was 2,441 at the 2020 census.

== History ==
East Kingston was once a part of Kingston called "Kingston East Parish", but was granted a separate charter in 1738 by Governor Jonathan Belcher. Several residents of East Kingston had petitioned Governor Belcher that its location was too distant from the Kingston school and place of worship.

The town grew up around the saw and grist mill at the Trickling Falls on the edge of Powwow Pond. Farms prospered on the good soil, and ice-cutting in the Powwow River was a thriving winter business before the age of refrigeration. The New England Brick Company was once a principal industry.

== Geography ==
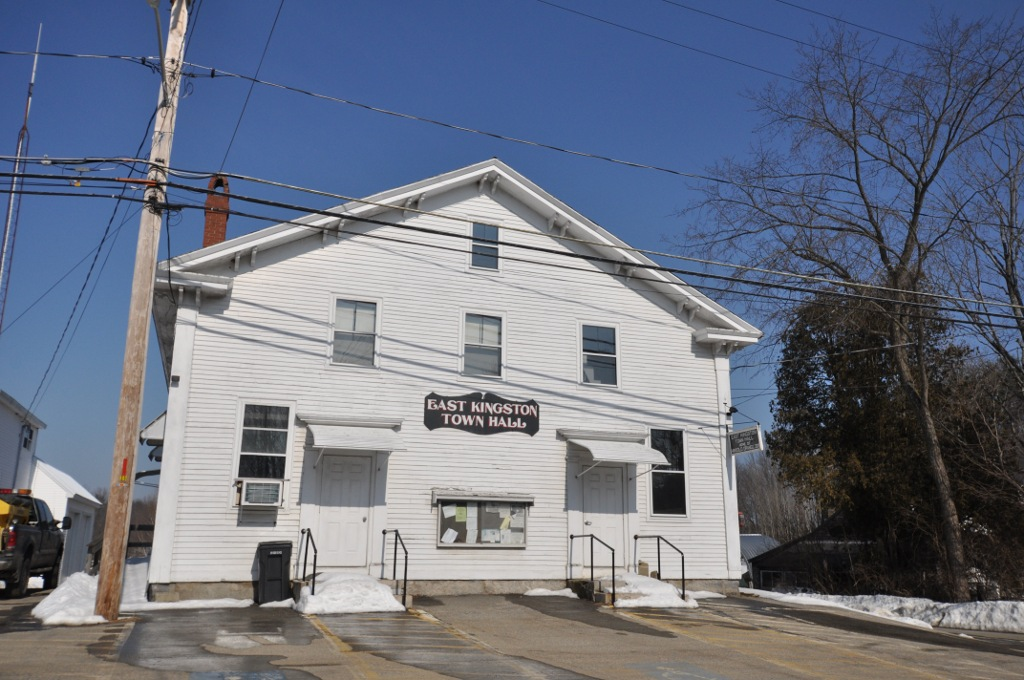
Town hall

According to the United States Census Bureau, the town has a total area of 10.0 square miles (25.8 km^{2}), of which 0.04 square miles (0.1 km^{2}) are water, comprising 0.56% of the town. The southern half of East Kingston is drained by the Powwow River, a tributary of the Merrimack River, while the remainder is drained by Great Brook, a tributary of the Exeter River, which ultimately drains to the Atlantic Ocean via Great Bay. A very small portion of 285-acre (115 ha) Powwow Pond on the Powwow River lies within the town. Roughly the northern half of East Kingston lies within the Piscataqua River (Coastal) watershed, with the southern half of town located in the Merrimack River watershed. The highest point in town is the summit of Morse Hill, at 315 feet (96 m) above sea level.

=== Adjacent municipalities ===
- Exeter (northeast)
- Kensington (east)
- South Hampton (south)
- Newton (southwest)
- Kingston (west)

== Demographics ==
Historical population
Census	Pop.	Note	%±
1790	358		—
1800	392		9.5%
1810	442		12.8%
1820	443		0.2%
1830	442		−0.2%
1840	551		24.7%
1850	532		−3.4%
1860	598		12.4%
1870	553		−7.5%
1880	576		4.2%
1890	461		−20.0%
1900	496		7.6%
1910	413		−16.7%
1920	384		−7.0%
1930	347		−9.6%
1940	424		22.2%
1950	449		5.9%
1960	574		27.8%
1970	838		46.0%
1980	1,135		35.4%
1990	1,352		19.1%
2000	1,784		32.0%
2010	2,357		32.1%
2020	2,441		3.6%
U.S. Decennial Census

As of the census of 2000, there were 1,784 people, 629 households, and 508 families residing in the town. The population density was 178.6 inhabitants per square mile (69.0/km^{2}). There were 648 housing units at an average density of 64.9 per square mile (25.1/km^{2}). The racial makeup of the town was 98.04% White, 0.11% African American, 0.06% Native American, 0.34% Asian, 0.06% Pacific Islander, 0.95% from other races, and 0.45% from two or more races. Hispanic or Latino of any race were 0.34% of the population.

There were 629 households, out of which 38.3% had children under the age of 18 living with them, 73.9% were married couples living together, 4.6% had a female householder with no husband present, and 19.2% were non-families. 13.5% of all households were made up of individuals, and 4.3% had someone living alone who was 65 years of age or older. The average household size was 2.84 and the average family size was 3.13.

In the town, the population was spread out, with 27.3% under the age of 18, 4.0% from 18 to 24, 33.2% from 25 to 44, 28.1% from 45 to 64, and 7.4% who were 65 years of age or older. The median age was 38 years. For every 100 females, there were 92.9 males. For every 100 females age 18 and over, there were 95.6 males.

The median income for a household in the town was $65,197, and the median income for a family was $71,705. Males had a median income of $52,885 versus $34,702 for females. The per capita income for the town was $28,844. About 3.2% of families and 4.4% of the population were below the poverty line, including 6.5% of those under age 18 and none of those age 65 or over.

== Government ==
Like most New England towns, East Kingston has a government run by a board of selectmen. The town holds town meetings in the town hall.

== Notable people ==
- Tom Eaton (born 1971), Grammy-nominated composer
- Daniel Tilton (1763–1830), Mississippi territorial judge
- Ebenezer Webster (1739–1806), militia colonel during the American Revolution
