= The North School =

Location
- Essella Road; Ashford, Kent, TN24 8AL; England
- Coordinates: 51.14441°N 0.88789°E

Information
- Type: Academy
- Local authority: Kent County Council
- Trust: Swale Academies Trust
- Department for Education URN: 118832 Tables
- Ofsted: Reports
- Headteacher: Clair Ellerby
- Gender: Coeducational
- Age: 11 to 19
- Enrolment: 1,277 (as of 2013)
- Website: https://www.thenorthschool.org.uk/

The North School is a coeducational secondary school and sixth form situated in the town of Ashford, Kent, England.

Previously a community school administered by Kent County Council, in January 2022 The North School converted to academy status. The school is now sponsored by Swale Academies Trust.

== School structure ==
=== Lower school ===
As of 2014, the lower school has an annual intake of around 125 students at the beginning of Year Seven (aged 11). The lower school (Years 7–11) is 1,064 students strong,. The school uniform consists of a logo blazer and black trousers or skirt. Socks must be plain black and shoes. Shirts must be worn with a tie.

== Curriculum ==
The school year runs from September to July, split across three terms: the autumn term (September to December), spring term (January to April) and the summer term (April to July). Students receive two weeks off for Christmas and Easter, a six-week summer break, and three "half term" breaks.
