= Walpole Society =

Society to promote British art and art history

The Walpole Society, named after Horace Walpole, was founded in 1911 to promote the study of the history of British art and artists. It is a membership society and registered charity.

From 1762 on, Walpole had published the first history of art in Britain, based on the manuscript notebooks of George Vertue, the most important source of information concerning British art before the mid-eighteenth century. One of the first goals of the Society was to publish these notebooks in their original form, which included much material that Walpole omitted.

The Society, based in London, publishes an annual volume of studies written by its members and scholars around the world. The field of research includes paintings, drawings, prints, miniatures, sculpture and illuminated manuscripts as well as patronage, collecting and travel. The period covered is the whole of the history of British art, from the Middle Ages to the present.

== Berger Prize ==
In 2024, the Walpole Society agreed with the Berger Collection Educational Trust (BCET) to run The Berger Prize, an annual book prize for art history.

== See also ==
- English school of painting
- Art history
