= New Hampshire Route 150 =

State highway in Rockingham County, New Hampshire, US

New Hampshire Route 150
- Map of Rockingham County in southeastern New Hampshire with NH 150 highlighted in red

Route information
- Maintained by NHDOT
- Length: 5.743 mi (9.242 km)

Major junctions
- South end: Route 150 in Amesbury, MA
- NH 107 in Kensington
- North end: NH 108 in Kensington

Location
- Country: United States
- State: New Hampshire
- Counties: Rockingham

Highway system
- New Hampshire Highway System; Interstate; US; State; Turnpikes
← NH 149	→ NH 151

New Hampshire Route 150 (abbreviated NH 150) is a 5.743-mile (9.242 km) north–south state highway in Rockingham County in southeastern New Hampshire, United States.

== Route description ==
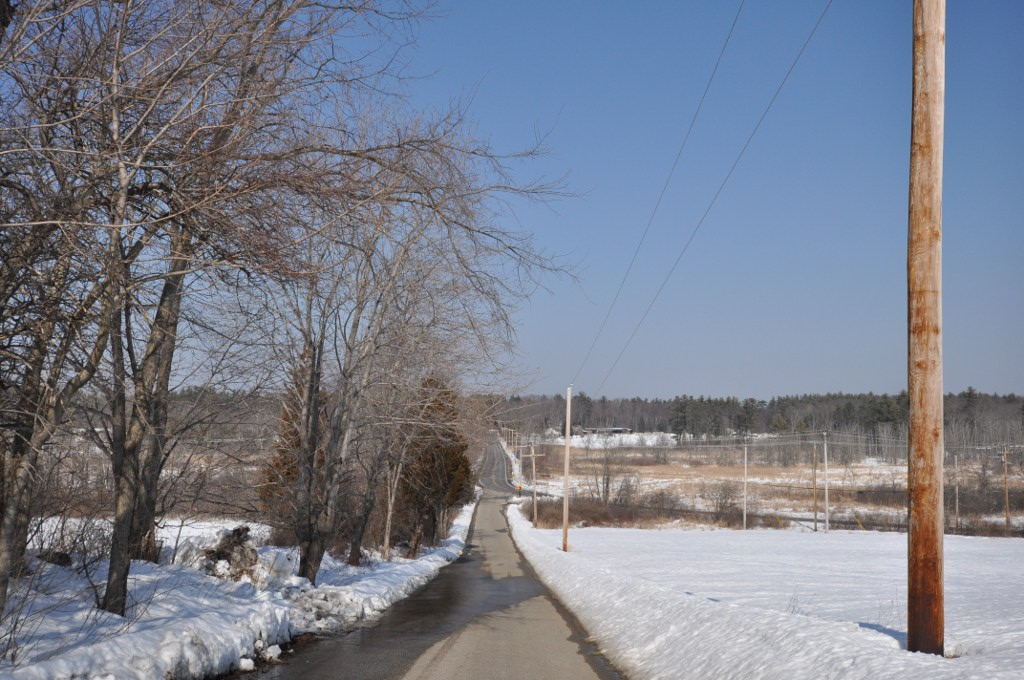
Looking north over Route 150 from Shaw Hill Road in Kensington, February 2013

The road runs from Kensington south to the Massachusetts border.

The southern terminus of NH 150 is at the Massachusetts state line in South Hampton, where the road continues south as Massachusetts Route 150 in the town of Amesbury. The northern terminus of NH 150 is at New Hampshire Route 108 in Kensington. For most of its length, NH 150 is named Amesbury Road.

== Major intersections ==
The entire route is in Rockingham County.

Location	mi	km	Destinations	Notes
South Hampton	0.000	0.000	Route 150 south (Market Street) – Amesbury	Continuation into Massachusetts.
Kensington	1.687	2.715	NH 107 (South Road) – Kingston, Seabrook	
Kensington	2.534	4.078	NH 84 east (Lamprey Road) – Hampton	Western terminus of NH 84
Kensington	5.743	9.242	NH 108 (North Haverhill Road) – East Kingston, Exeter	Northern terminus
1.000 mi = 1.609 km; 1.000 km = 0.621 mi

== In popular culture ==
NH 150 in Kensington, near where it intersects with Brewer Road, was the location of the Exeter incident, a highly publicized UFO sighting that occurred on September 3, 1965.

== See also ==
- List of state highways in New Hampshire
