= Lutheran High School North (Michigan) =

Location
- 16825 24 Mile Rd; Macomb, Michigan 48042; 42°41′15″N 82°57′22″W

Information
- Other names: Lutheran North, LNHS
- Type: Private
- Religious affiliation: Christian
- Established: 1972
- Locale: Large suburb
- School district: Lutheran High School Association
- NCES School ID: 00642059
- Principal: John Reincke
- Teaching staff: 35
- Grades: 9th-12th
- Gender: Coed
- Enrollment: 560
- Student to teacher ratio: 16:1
- Colors: Yellow and Black
- Athletics conference: Catholic High School League
- Mascot: Mustang
- Affiliation: Lutheran Church Missouri Synod

Lutheran High School North, known locally as Lutheran North, is a private, coed high school located in Macomb, Michigan, about 25 miles outside of Detroit. The school is one of three members of the Lutheran High School Association, and is accredited by both the National Lutheran School Accreditation and the Michigan Association of Non-public Schools.

== History ==
On February 9, 1965, a pastoral conference of Pontiac, Rochester, Utica, and Mount Clemens met at St. Mark's Lutheran Church in Union Lake, Michigan to hear a member of the Lutheran Church Missouri Synod present Lutheran High Schools - Why?

Following this conference, a committee was selected to outline a study on the viability of a Lutheran school in the area. In early 1966, representatives from 38 congregations in Oakland and Macomb counties met and formed three committees: Membership, Site, and Finance. The representatives passed a resolution to form an ad-hoc Lutheran High School North Committee. From this group, an executive committee, made up of pastors and teachers, discussed plans for further organization.

Funding for obtaining the land and building of the school was lacking in the early stages, but through the sales of bonds, other properties obtained by the site committee, and donations the money needed to acquire properties for two Lutheran High School sites was raised. The funds received from this venture also allowed the opportunity to open Lutheran High School North in September 1972 with a first-year enrollment of 77 students.

== Student Demographics ==
As of the 2019–2020 school year the total enrollment was 560 students. Approximately 53% of the students were female, while 47% were male.

Race/Ethnicity	Enrollment	Percent of Student Population
White (non-Hispanic)	536	95.7%
Asian/Pacific Islander	17	3%
Hispanic	4	0.7%
Black	3	0.6%

The school saw a somewhat steady decrease in enrollment between 2005 and 2011, but it appears to have plateaued since then.

== Athletics ==
Lutheran North is a member of the Catholic High School League (CHSL) in southeastern Michigan. Currently, the school offers students the opportunity to participate in 21 varsity sports. To date, the baseball, dance, girls golf, softball, and boys basketball teams have each claimed their respective championship titles.

Fall Sports
Girls	Boys
Cheer	Cross country
Dance	Football
Cross country	Soccer
Golf	
Volleyball	
Winter Sports
Girls	Boys
Basketball	Basketball
Cheer	Hockey*
Dance	
Hockey	
Spring Sports
Girls	Boys
Soccer	Baseball
Softball	Golf
Track and field	Lacrosse*
	Track and field

*co-op with Bishop Foley |

Mens Sports
Wrestling

== Notable alumni ==
- Taylor Ferns - became the youngest winning female driver in USAC history at the age of 16
- Ryan Monroe - Roseville Police Chief
- Kat Timpf - TV personality
