= Mompesson House =

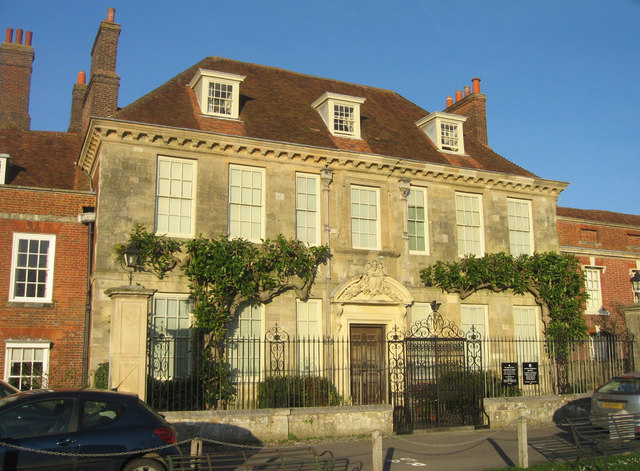
- South front

- Location within Wiltshire
- 51°04′00″N 1°47′54″W
- Type: Mansion
- Location: 53, The Close, Salisbury
- OS grid reference: SU 14228 29731

History
- Built: 1701

Site notes
- Area: Wiltshire
- Architectural style: Queen Anne
- Owner: National Trust

Listed Building – Grade I
- Official name: Mompesson House
- Designated: 28 February 1952
- Reference no.: 1355808

Listed Building – Grade I
- Official name: Screen wall, rails, piers, gates and overthrow in front of Mompesson House
- Designated: 12 October 1972
- Reference no.: 1253989

Mompesson House is an 18th-century house in the Cathedral Close, Salisbury, Wiltshire, England. The house is Grade I listed and has been in the ownership of the National Trust since 1975.

== History ==
The Mompesson family had lived in Wiltshire since the fifteenth century, residing in Bathampton. Thomas Mompesson the elder moved to Salisbury, securing a 40-year lease on the north side of Chorister's Green in 1635 and building a large property with a hall and ten other rooms. His son, Sir Thomas Mompesson, MP for the constituency of Salisbury in 1679, 1695 and 1701, rebuilt the property in the late 1670s as well as adding the adjacent stable block. The site was purchased at the end of the 17th century and the house reflects the classic Queen Anne style of that period, as well as the influence of Christopher Wren. It is built with ashlar Chilmark stone. To the right of the main house stands the brick-built service building which was constructed on the site of the old Eagle Inn that closed in 1625.

Thomas's son Charles completed the building in 1701; his initials and date can be seen on the heads of the water downpipes. The renovations included a new stone façade, and created the building seen today. In 1703 Charles commemorated his marriage to Elizabeth Longueville by adding a cartouche over the front door displaying their joined coats of arms. After Charles' death in 1714, Elizabeth's brother Charles Longueville moved into the house with his widowed sister. They added the plasterwork, staircase and the brick wing in 1740. After Charles Longueville's death, he attempted to leave the house to his natural-born son, John Clark. However, Elizabeth refused to administer his will and instead added a codicil to her own will stipulating that John Clark would only have the right to use the house for his lifetime, after which the house would pass to Mr Thomas Hayter of Salisbury.

Next, the house was occupied by Ann Wyndham, the widowed Mrs Henry Portman and her three daughters, Ann Mary, Henrietta, and Wyndham. Henrietta was the last of the sisters to die in 1846 and her son transferred the lease to William Oliver Colt, the brother-in-law of George Barnard Townsend. The Townsend family occupied the house from 1846 to 1939, and the flamboyant artist Miss Barbara Townsend, mentioned in Edith Olivier's book Four Victorian Ladies of Wiltshire, lived there for almost all of her 96 years. In 1946, the Dean and Chapter of Salisbury Cathedral negotiated with the Church Commissioners to transfer ownership of the Bishop's Palace to accommodate the ever-expanding Cathedral School. In return, the Church Commissioners received Mompesson House as the new Bishop's residence, occupied by Geoffrey Lunt and William Anderson, though the latter found the house lacked sufficient privacy and moved out in 1951.

In 1952 the freehold was purchased from the Church Commissioners by the architect, Denis Martineau, who immediately bequeathed it to the National Trust, though continued to live in the house until his death in 1975. Martineau completed extensive repairs and renovation throughout the property and opened the home to visitors two afternoons each week. The National Trust spent the next two years redecorating the property and acquiring a suitable collection of furniture, before the house opened to the public in May 1977.

The overthrow, iron railings, gates and iron lamps at the front of the building are Grade I listed separately from the house.

== Collections ==
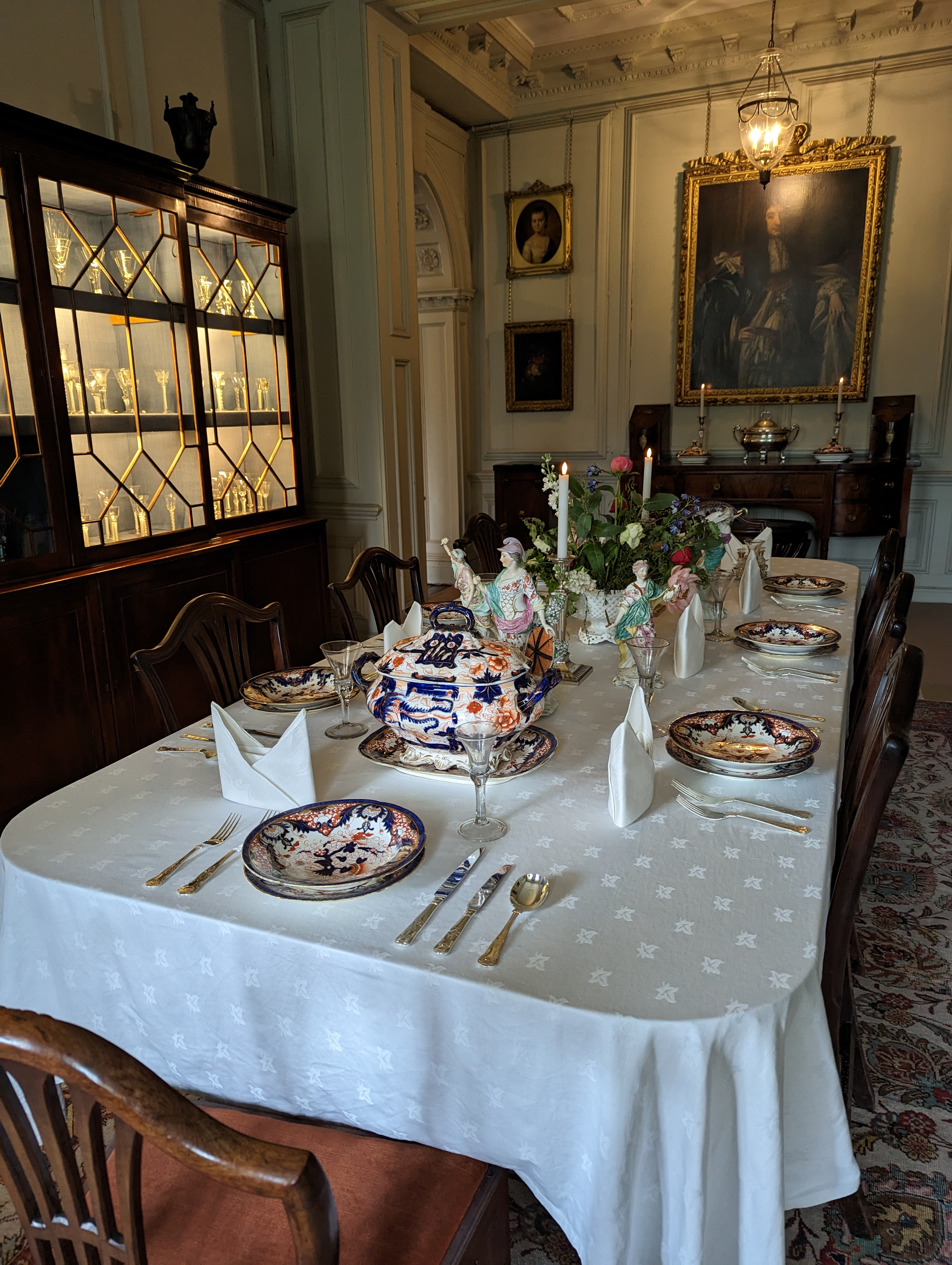
The dining room at Mompesson House

The house contains Georgian plasterwork and carvings of exceptional quality which have been carefully restored by the National Trust, including the removal of many layers of paint which had obscured them. When the Trust inherited the house, it was empty of furnishings as Martineau had bequeathed his possessions to relatives. The Trust has therefore redecorated the visitor rooms with 18th-century pieces.

In keeping with the Georgian interiors, the dining room in the house is used to display the Turnbull collection of English 18th-century drinking glasses bequeathed to the Trust in 1970 by Mr. O.G.N. Turnbull. The house also hosts the Bessemer-Wright collection of ceramics, bequeathed by Mrs Adam Smith, which includes porcelain figures from the Derby & Bow factories, Sèvres plates and Wedgewood urns.

== In popular culture ==
Mompesson House was used as a location for the 1995 film adaptation of Sense and Sensibility.

== Bibliography ==
- Garnett, Oliver (2008). Mompesson House. Swindon: National Trust. ISBN 978-1-84359-282-2.
- Pevsner, Nikolaus; Cherry, Bridget (2002). Wiltshire. New Haven: Yale University Press. ISBN 9780300096590.
- Reiff, Daniel D. (1986). Small Georgian Houses in England and Virginia: origins and development through the 1750s. London: Associated University Presses. ISBN 0874132541.
- Stratton, Arthur (1920). The English interior, a review of the decoration of English homes from Tudor times to the XIXth century. London: B.T. Batsford.
