= South Hampton, New Hampshire =

- Town
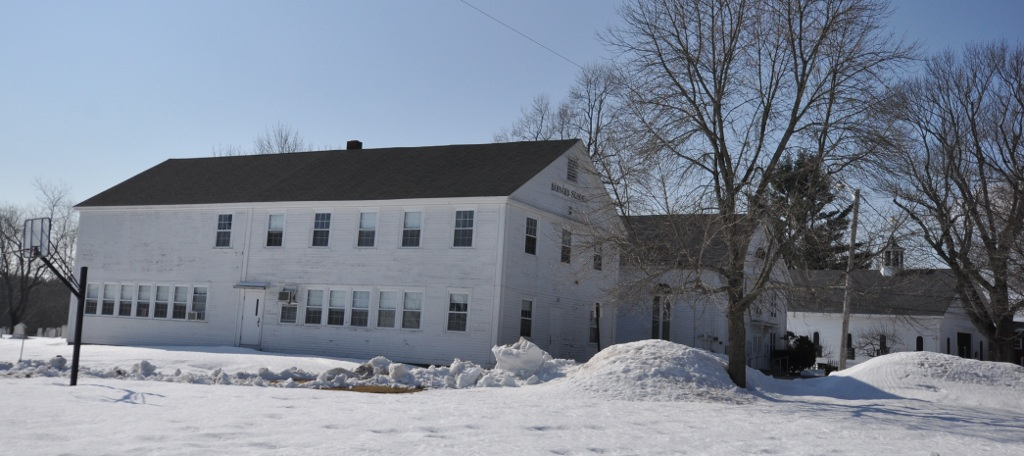
- Town hall

- Location in Rockingham County and the state of New Hampshire.
- Coordinates: 42°53′08″N 70°58′05″W
- Country: United States
- State: New Hampshire
- County: Rockingham
- Incorporated: 1742

Area
  - Total: 8.05 sq mi (20.85 km^{2})
  - Land: 8.02 sq mi (20.78 km^{2})
  - Water: 0.023 sq mi (0.06 km^{2}) 0.31%
- Elevation: 135 ft (41 m)

Population (2020)
  - Total: 894
  - Density: 110/sq mi (43/km^{2})
- Time zone: UTC-5 (Eastern)
  - Summer (DST): UTC-4 (Eastern)
- ZIP code: 03827
- Area code: 603
- FIPS code: 33-71140
- GNIS feature ID: 873722
- Website: www.southhamptonnh.org

South Hampton is a town in Rockingham County, New Hampshire, United States. The population was 894 at the 2020 census. South Hampton is home to Cowden State Forest and Powwow River State Forest.

== History ==
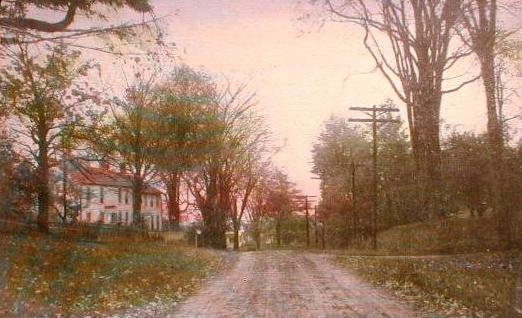
South Hampton c. 1910

South Hampton was one of the first towns granted by colonial governor Benning Wentworth after the separation of the governorships of New Hampshire and Massachusetts in 1741. The border between the two colonies was fixed, and consequently South Hampton would be chartered in 1742 from former parts of Amesbury and Salisbury, Massachusetts. Over the years, the town lost territory to Hampton Falls, Seabrook and Newton, but gained territory from East Kingston in 1824. Though it was once part of the larger town of Hampton (as were the also separate towns of Hampton Falls and North Hampton), it no longer borders its namesake town due to these border changes.

The town's Justices of the Peace in 1831 were Parker Merrill, George W. Pillsbury, Benning Leavitt, John Palmer and A. Brown.

At one time, the town was home to over twelve different religious sects. One of South Hampton's only members of the New Hampshire State Senate was Benjamin Barnard, who served from 1806 to 1808.

== Geography ==
According to the United States Census Bureau, the town has a total area of 8.0 square miles (20.8 km^{2}), of which 0.02 square miles (0.06 km^{2}) are water, comprising 0.31% of the town. South Hampton is drained by the Powwow River, part of the Merrimack River watershed. The highest point in town is the summit of Chair Hill, at 330 feet (100 m) above sea level, near the eastern end of town.

Routes 107A and 150 go through South Hampton. The nearest Interstate is Interstate 495 in Amesbury, Massachusetts, one town to the south.

Attractions in South Hampton include Heron Pond Farm and Jewell Towne Vineyards.

=== Adjacent municipalities ===
- Kensington (north)
- Seabrook (east)
- Salisbury, Massachusetts (southeast at one point)
- Amesbury, Massachusetts (south)
- Newton (west)
- East Kingston (northwest)

== Demographics ==
Historical population
Census	Pop.	Note	%±
1790	448		—
1800	387		−13.6%
1810	427		10.3%
1820	416		−2.6%
1830	487		17.1%
1840	462		−5.1%
1850	472		2.2%
1860	549		16.3%
1870	448		−18.4%
1880	383		−14.5%
1890	370		−3.4%
1900	297		−19.7%
1910	279		−6.1%
1920	230		−17.6%
1930	261		13.5%
1940	294		12.6%
1950	314		6.8%
1960	443		41.1%
1970	558		26.0%
1980	660		18.3%
1990	740		12.1%
2000	844		14.1%
2010	814		−3.6%
2020	894		9.8%
U.S. Decennial Census

As of the census of 2000, there were 844 people, 301 households, and 244 families residing in the town. The population density was 107.2 inhabitants per square mile (41.4/km^{2}). There were 308 housing units at an average density of 39.1 per square mile (15.1/km^{2}). The racial makeup of the town was 97.99% White, 0.59% African American, 0.12% Asian, 0.47% Pacific Islander, and 0.83% from two or more races. Hispanic or Latino of any race were 0.36% of the population.

There were 301 households, out of which 34.9% had children under the age of 18 living with them, 69.1% were married couples living together, 7.6% had a female householder with no husband present, and 18.9% were non-families. 13.0% of all households were made up of individuals, and 6.3% had someone living alone who was 65 years of age or older. The average household size was 2.80 and the average family size was 3.07.

In the town, the population was spread out, with 24.9% under the age of 18, 4.3% from 18 to 24, 28.7% from 25 to 44, 28.7% from 45 to 64, and 13.5% who were 65 years of age or older. The median age was 40 years. For every 100 females, there were 88.8 males. For every 100 females age 18 and over, there were 89.3 males.

The median income for a household in the town was $63,750, and the median income for a family was $75,778. Males had a median income of $45,156 versus $30,625 for females. The per capita income for the town was $28,287. About 0.8% of families and 2.7% of the population were below the poverty line, including 3.4% of those under age 18 and none of those age 65 or over.

== Education ==
South Hampton has only one school, the K–8 Barnard School. High school students from South Hampton can either attend Winnacunnet High School in Hampton or Amesbury High School in Massachusetts.
