= List of Lutheran schools in the United States =

Lutheran schools in the United States are educational institutions set up under or affiliated with various Lutheran denominations. These synods are not affiliated with each other and vary in their doctrinal beliefs. Most Lutheran schools in the United States are associated with the Lutheran Church–Missouri Synod (LCMS), or the Wisconsin Evangelical Lutheran Synod (WELS), though there are several which are associated with other Lutheran denominations such as the Evangelical Lutheran Church in America (ELCA), Lutheran Congregations in Mission for Christ (LCMC), and the Church of the Lutheran Confession (CLC).

== Primary education ==
The following is a list of Lutheran elementary schools in the United States for which Wikipedia articles exist:

=== California ===
- First Lutheran School of Venice, Venice (LCMS) - Closed 2018
- Good Shepherd Lutheran School, Inglewood (LCMS) - Closed 2003
- Ramona Lutheran School, Ramona (LCMS)

=== Florida ===
- Trinity Lutheran School, Orlando (LCMS)

=== Illinois ===
- Pilgrim Lutheran School, Chicago (ELCA)

=== Indiana ===
- Evansville Lutheran School, Evansville (LCMS)
- Saint James Lutheran School, Lafayette (LCMS)

=== Kansas ===
- Topeka Lutheran School, Topeka, Kansas (LCMS) - Closed 2023

=== Maryland ===
- Trinity Lutheran Christian School, Joppa - Closed 2025

=== Michigan ===
- St. John's Lutheran School, New Boston (LCMS)

=== Missouri ===
- Christ Community Lutheran School, Kirkwood
- Immanuel Lutheran School, Perryville (LCMS)
- Trinity Lutheran School, Freistatt (LCMS)

=== Ohio ===
- Saint Mark's Lutheran School, Milford (LCMS)

=== Virginia ===
- Trinity Lutheran School, Newport News (ELCA)

=== Wisconsin ===
- Immanuel Lutheran School, Mayville (LCMS)
- St. Martini Lutheran School, Milwaukee (LCMS)

== Secondary education ==
The following is a list of Lutheran high schools in the United States for which Wikipedia articles exist:

=== Arizona ===
- Arizona Lutheran Academy, Phoenix (WELS)
- North Valley Christian Academy, Phoenix (LCMS)
- Valley Lutheran High School, Phoenix (LCMS)

=== California ===
- California Lutheran Academy, Wildomar (WELS)
- Crean Lutheran High School, Irvine (LCMS)
- Lutheran High School-La Verne, La Verne (LCMS) - Closed 2023
- Lutheran High School of Orange County, Orange (LCMS)
- Victory Christian Academy, Chula Vista (LCMS)

=== Colorado ===
- Lutheran High School, Parker (LCMS)

=== Florida ===
- Orlando Lutheran Academy, Orlando - Closed 2010

=== Hawaii ===
- Lutheran High School of Hawaii, Honolulu (LCMS) - Closed 2016

=== Illinois ===
- Christ Lutheran High School, Buckley (LCMS)
- Faith Lutheran High School, Crystal Lake (LCMS) - Closed 2019
- Illinois Lutheran High School, Crete, Illinois (WELS)
- Luther High School North, Chicago (LCMS) - Closed 2017
- Luther High School South, Chicago (LCMS) - Closed 2014
- Lutheran High School, Springfield (LCMS)
- Rockford Lutheran School, Rockford, Illinois (LCMS, ELCA)
- Melrose Park - Walther Christian Academy, Melrose Park (LCMS)

=== Indiana ===
- Concordia Lutheran High School, Fort Wayne (LCMS)
- Lutheran High School of Indianapolis, Indianapolis (LCMS)
- Trinity Lutheran High School, Seymour (LCMS)

=== Maryland ===
- Concordia Preparatory School, Towson (LCMS)
- Harford Lutheran School, Bel Air - Closed 2009

=== Michigan ===
- Detroit Lutheran High School, Detroit (LCMS) - Closed 1957
- Lutheran High School East, Harper Woods (LCMS) - Closed 2004
- Lutheran High School North, Macomb (LCMS)
- Lutheran High School Northwest, Rochester Hills (LCMS)
- Lutheran High School South, Newport (LCMS) - Closed 2016
- Lutheran High School West, Detroit (LCMS) - Closed 1995
- Lutheran High School Westland, Westland (LCMS)
- Michigan Lutheran Seminary, Saginaw (WELS)
- Valley Lutheran High School, Saginaw (LCMS)
- West Michigan Lutheran High School, Wyoming (LCMS)

=== Minnesota ===
- Concordia Academy, Roseville (LCMS)
- Hillcrest Lutheran Academy, Fergus Falls (Church of the Lutheran Brethren)
- Hope Lutheran High School, Winona (LCMS)
- Minnesota Valley Lutheran High School, New Ulm (WELS)
- St. Croix Lutheran Academy, West Saint Paul (WELS)
- West Lutheran High School, Plymouth (WELS)

=== Missouri ===
- Lutheran High School North, St. Louis County (LCMS)
- Lutheran High School of Kansas City, Kansas City (LCMS)
- Lutheran High School South, St. Louis County (LCMS)
- Saxony Lutheran High School, Jackson (LCMS)
- St. Paul Lutheran High School, Concordia (LCMS)

=== Nebraska ===
- Lincoln Lutheran Middle/High School, Lincoln (LCMS)

=== Nevada ===
- Faith Lutheran Middle School & High School, Las Vegas (LCMS)

=== New York ===
- Long Island Lutheran Middle and High School, Brookville (LCMS)
- Martin Luther School, Maspeth, Queens (LCMS)
- Our Saviour Lutheran School, Morris Park, Bronx (LCMS)

=== North Dakota ===
- Oak Grove Lutheran School, Fargo (ELCA)
- Our Redeemer's Christian School, Minot (CLB)

=== Ohio ===
- Lutheran High School East, Cleveland Heights (LCMS)
- Lutheran High School West, Rocky River (LCMS)

=== Oregon ===
- Portland Lutheran High School, Portland (LCMS) - Closed 2015
- Trinity Lutheran School, Bend (LCMS)

=== South Dakota ===
- Great Plains Lutheran High School, Watertown (WELS)

=== Texas ===
- Concordia Lutheran High School, Tomball (LCMS)
- Lutheran High School of San Antonio, San Antonio (LCMS)
- Lutheran North Academy, Houston (LCMS) - Closed 2024
- Lutheran South Academy, Houston (LCMS)

=== Utah ===
- Concordia Preparatory School, Riverton, formerly known as Salt Lake Lutheran High School (LCMS) - Closed 2015

=== Washington ===
- Evergreen Lutheran High School, Tacoma (WELS)
- Seattle Lutheran High School, Seattle (LCMS & ELCA) - Closed 2022

=== Wisconsin ===
- Fox Valley Lutheran High School, Appleton (WELS)
- Kettle Moraine Lutheran High School, Jackson (WELS)
- Luther High School, Onalaska (WELS)
- Luther Preparatory School, Watertown (WELS)
- Manitowoc Lutheran High School, Manitowoc (WELS)
- Martin Luther High School, Greendale (LCMS)
- Milwaukee Lutheran High School, Milwaukee (LCMS)
- Northeastern Wisconsin Lutheran High School, Green Bay (LCMS)
- Northland Lutheran High School, Mosinee (WELS)
- Racine Lutheran High School, Racine (LCMS)
- Sheboygan Lutheran High School, Sheboygan (LCMS)
- Shoreland Lutheran High School, Somers (WELS)
- Winnebago Lutheran Academy, Fond du Lac (WELS)
- Wisconsin Lutheran High School, Milwaukee (WELS)

== Post-secondary education ==
Many North American Lutheran denominations have universities and seminaries affiliated with them. The ELCA has schools which are part of the Network of ELCA Colleges and Universities while the Lutheran Church–Missouri Synod has the Concordia University System. Other denominations such as the Wisconsin Evangelical Lutheran Synod, Evangelical Lutheran Synod, Church of the Lutheran Brethren, also have their own colleges and universities. Valparaiso University is a Lutheran university that is not affiliated directly with a single denomination but shares ties to the ELCA and LCMS.

== See also ==
- List of Lutheran schools in Australia
- List of schools in the United States
- List of Baptist schools in the United States
- List of independent Catholic schools in the United States
- List of international schools in the United States
