= Lutheran High School =

Lutheran High School may refer to:

- Lutheran High School (Arkansas) — Little Rock, Arkansas
- Lutheran High School (Elk Grove, California)
- Lutheran High School (Colorado)
- Lutheran High School (La Verne, California)
- Lutheran High School (Springfield, Illinois)
- Lutheran High School (Indianapolis), Indiana
- Lutheran High School (Louisiana) — Metairie, Louisiana
- Lutheran High School (Minnesota) — Mayer, Minnesota
- Lutheran High School of Kansas City, Missouri
- Lutheran High School (Salt Lake City, Utah)
- Lutheran High School (Milwaukee), Wisconsin

It may also refer to one of the following:

- Arizona Lutheran Academy — Phoenix, Arizona
- California Lutheran Academy — Wildomar, California
- Christ Lutheran High School (Illinois) — Buckley, Illinois
- Christ Lutheran High School (Iowa) — Davenport, Iowa
- Concordia Academy-Bloomington, Minnesota (formerly known as Lutheran High School of Greater Minneapolis)
- Concordia Lutheran High School (Indiana) — Fort Wayne, Indiana
- Concordia Lutheran High School (Texas) — Tomball, Texas
- Denver Lutheran High School — Denver, Colorado
- Evergreen Lutheran High School — Des Moines, Washington
- First Lutheran High School — Sylmar, California
- Fox Valley Lutheran Academy — Elgin, Illinois
- Fox Valley Lutheran High School — Appleton, Wisconsin
- Great Plains Lutheran High School — Watertown, South Dakota
- Hillcrest Lutheran Academy — Fergus Falls, Minnesota
- Hope Lutheran High School — Winona, Minnesota
- Illinois Lutheran High School — Crete, Illinois
- Immanuel Lutheran College High School — Eau Claire, Wisconsin
- Kettle Moraine Lutheran High School — Jackson, Wisconsin
- Lakeside Lutheran High School — Lake Mills, Wisconsin
- Lincoln Lutheran Middle/High School — Lincoln, Nebraska
- Los Angeles Lutheran High School — Sylmar, California
- Lutheran East High School — Cleveland Heights, Ohio
- Lutheran High Northeast — Norfolk, Nebraska
- Lutheran High School North (Michigan) — Macomb, Michigan
- Lutheran High School North (Missouri) — St. Louis, Missouri
- Lutheran High School North (Texas) — Houston, Texas
- Lutheran High School Northwest — Rochester Hills, Michigan
- Dallas Lutheran School (Texas) — Dallas, Texas
- Lutheran High School of Hawaii — Honolulu, Hawaii
- Lutheran High School of Orange County — Orange, California
- Lutheran High School of Philadelphia — Philadelphia, Pennsylvania
- Lutheran High School of St. Charles County — St. Peters, Missouri
- Lutheran High School of San Antonio — San Antonio, Texas
- Lutheran High School of San Diego — San Diego, California (former name of Victory Christian Academy)
- Lutheran High School South — St. Louis, Missouri
- Lutheran High School Westland, Michigan
- Lutheran High School West — Rocky River, Ohio
- Manitowoc Lutheran High School, Wisconsin
- Michigan Lutheran High School — St. Joseph, Michigan
- Michigan Lutheran Seminary School — Saginaw, Michigan
- Milwaukee Lutheran High School, Wisconsin
- Minnesota Valley Lutheran High School — New Ulm, Minnesota
- Northeastern Wisconsin Lutheran High School — Green Bay, Wisconsin
- Northland Lutheran High School — Kronenwetter, Wisconsin
- Racine Lutheran High School — Racine, Wisconsin
- Rockford Lutheran School — Rockford, Illinois
- St. Croix Lutheran High School — West St. Paul, Minnesota
- St. Paul Lutheran High School — Concordia, Missouri
- Seattle Lutheran High School, Washington
- Sheboygan Area Lutheran High School, Wisconsin
- Shoreland Lutheran High School — Somers, Wisconsin
- South Bay Lutheran High School — Inglewood, California
- Trinity Lutheran High School — Reseda, California
- Valley Lutheran High School (Arizona) — Phoenix, Arizona
- Valley Lutheran High School (Michigan) — Saginaw, Michigan
- Walther Lutheran High School — Melrose Park, Illinois
- West Lutheran High School — Plymouth, Minnesota
- Winnebago Lutheran Academy — Fond du Lac, Wisconsin
- Wisconsin Lutheran High School — Milwaukee, Wisconsin
