= Trinity Lutheran School =

Trinity Lutheran School may refer to:

- Trinity Lutheran School (Bend, Oregon)
- Trinity Lutheran School (Evansville, Indiana)
- Trinity Lutheran High School, Seymour, Indiana
- Trinity Lutheran School (Harris County, Texas)
- Trinity Lutheran School (Kaukauna, Wisconsin)
- Trinity Lutheran School (Lincoln, Nebraska)
- Trinity Lutheran School (Newport News, Virginia)
- Trinity Lutheran School (Orlando, Florida)
- Trinity Lutheran School (Monroe, Michigan)
- Trinity Lutheran School (Wellsboro, Pennsylvania)
- Trinity Lutheran School (St. George, Utah)
