= Luther High School =

Luther High School may refer to one of the following high schools:

In Canada:

- Luther College High School — Regina, Saskatchewan

In the United States:

- Luther High School (Florida) — Orlando, Florida
- Luther High School (Oklahoma) — Luther, Oklahoma
- Luther High School (Wisconsin) — Onalaska, Wisconsin
- Luther Burbank High School — Sacramento, California
- Luther East High School — Lansing, Illinois
- Luther High School North — Chicago, Illinois
- Luther South Math, Science & Performing Arts High School — Chicago, Illinois
- Martin Luther High School — Greendale, Wisconsin
- Martin Luther High School (Minnesota) — Northrop, Minnesota
- Martin Luther High School (New York City) — Maspeth, New York
- Martin Luther High School (Wisconsin) — Greendale, Wisconsin
