= TLS =

TLS may refer to:

== Computing ==
- Transport Layer Security, a cryptographic protocol for secure computer network communication
- Thread level speculation, an optimisation on multiprocessor CPUs
- Thread-local storage, a mechanism for allocating variables in computer science
- Transparent LAN Service, a transparent data link connecting remote Ethernet networks

== Media ==
- Theaterlexikon der Schweiz, an encyclopedia about theatre in Switzerland
- The Times Literary Supplement, a British fortnightly literary review
- Town Life Stuff, one of The Sims 3 Stuff packs

== Organisations ==
=== Education ===
- The Lindsey School, a secondary school in Cleethorpes, North East Lincolnshire, England
- Tallinn Law School, in Estonia
- Torrey Life Science, a biology organization of the University of Connecticut, US
- Trinity Law School, in Santa Ana, California, US
- Trinity Lutheran School (disambiguation), several schools in the US
- Tulane University Law School, in New Orleans, Louisiana, US

=== Other organisations ===
- Telstra (ASX code), an Australian telecommunications and media company
- Trans Link Systems B.V., a company delivering the OV-chipkaart system to public-transport operators in the Netherlands
- Transmitter Location Systems, a US satellite radio interference geolocation company

== Science, medicine and technology ==
- Thüringer Landessternwarte Tautenburg, the Karl Schwarzschild Observatory, in Tautenburg, Thuringia, Germany
- Terrestrial laser scanning, a 3D laser scanning method
- Total least squares, a statistical analysis
- Translesion synthesis, a form of DNA repair
- Transponder landing system, an airplane landing system
- Tumor lysis syndrome, a group of metabolic complications that can occur after treatment of cancer
- Tunable laser spectrometer, an instrument in the Mars rover suite Sample Analysis at Mars
- Two-level system, a quantum system

== Transport ==
- Thorpe-le-Soken railway station, Tendring, England (National Rail station code)
- Toulouse–Blagnac Airport (IATA code)

== Other uses ==
- East Timor (IOC code)
