= ELHS =

ELHS may refer to:

- East Lansing High School, East Lansing, Michigan, United States
- East Laurens High School, East Dublin, Georgia, United States
- East Lincoln High School, Denver, North Carolina, United States
- East Liverpool High School, East Liverpool, Ohio, United States
- East Lyme High School, East Lyme, Connecticut, United States
- Edward Little High School, Auburn, Maine, United States
- East Longmeadow High School, East Longmeadow, Massachusetts, United States
- Evergreen Lutheran High School, Des Moines, Washington, United States
- East Lake High School, Tarpon Springs, Florida, United States
