= List of international schools in the United States =

This is a list of notable international schools in the United States.

== California ==
- Alliant International University, Irvine, Fresno, Los Angeles, Sacramento, San Diego, San Francisco
- American University Preparatory School, Los Angeles
- Chinese American International School, San Francisco
- German International School of Silicon Valley, San Francisco/Mountain View
- The International School of San Francisco, San Francisco
- International School of Los Angeles, Burbank
- Lycée Français de San Francisco, San Francisco/Sausalito
- Lycée Français de Los Angeles, Los Angeles
- Nishiyamato Academy of California, Lomita
- Oakland International High School
- Pacific Rim International School, San Mateo/Emeryville
- Silicon Valley International School, Palo Alto/Menlo Park
- Yew Chung International School of Silicon Valley, Mountain View

== Colorado ==
- International School of Denver, Denver

== Connecticut ==
- International School at Dundee, Riverside
- Japanese School of New York, Greenwich

== District of Columbia ==
- British School of Washington
- Russian Embassy School in Washington, D.C.
- Washington International School

== Florida ==
- Schiller International University
- North Broward Preparatory School
- Windermere Preparatory School

== Georgia ==
- Atlanta International School, Atlanta

== Hawaii ==
- Varsity International School, Honolulu

== Illinois ==
- British International School of Chicago Lincoln Park, Chicago
- British International School of Chicago, South Loop, Chicago
- Chicago Futabakai Japanese School, Arlington Heights
- French-American School of Chicago, Chicago
- Lycée Français de Chicago, Chicago

== Indiana ==
- International School of Indiana, Indianapolis

== Louisiana ==
- Lycée Français de la Nouvelle-Orléans, New Orleans

== Maryland ==
- German International School Washington D.C., Potomac
- Rochambeau French International School, Bethesda

== Massachusetts ==
- British International School of Boston, Boston
- German International School Boston, Boston
- International School of Boston, Cambridge
- Snowden International School, Boston

== Michigan ==
- French School of Detroit, Bloomfield Township
- International Academy, Bloomfield Township
- International Academy of Macomb, Clinton Township

== Minnesota ==
- Saint Paul Preparatory School, Saint Paul
- The International School of Minnesota, Eden Prairie

== Nevada ==
- Henderson International School, Henderson

== New Jersey ==
- New Jersey Japanese School, Oakland
- Princeton International School of Mathematics and Science, Princeton

== New Mexico ==
- United World College, USA, Montezuma

== New York ==
- Avenues: The World School, Manhattan
- British International School of New York, Manhattan
- College of Staten Island High School for International Studies, Staten Island
- The École, Manhattan
- The Flushing International High School, Queens
- French-American School of New York, Larchmont/Mamaroneck
- German International School New York, White Plains
- Global School Brooklyn, Brooklyn
- Harrow International School New York, Oakdale
- The International High School, Queens
- Keio Academy of New York, Purchase
- Kennedy International School, Manhattan
- Lycée Français de New York, Manhattan
- La Scuola d'Italia Guglielmo Marconi, Manhattan
- Pine Street School, Manhattan
- Russian Mission School in New York, The Bronx
- United Nations International School, Manhattan

== North Carolina ==
- American Hebrew Academy, Greensboro
- British International School of Charlotte, Charlotte

== Oregon ==
- International School of Portland Portland
- French International School of Oregon, Portland
- German American School, Beaverton
- International School of Beaverton, Beaverton

== Pennsylvania ==
- French International School of Philadelphia, Bala Cynwyd

== Texas ==
- Austin International School, Austin
- Awty International School, Spring Branch
- British International School of Houston, Katy
- Dallas International School, Dallas
- The Village School, Houston

== Washington ==
- French Immersion School of Washington, Bellevue
- International Community School, Kirkland
- International School, Bellevue

== See also ==
- Lists of schools in the United States
- List of Baptist schools in the United States
- List of independent Catholic schools in the United States
- List of Lutheran schools in the United States
