= Lists of schools in the United States =

Private schools

Public schools

These are lists of schools in the United States.

== A–H ==
- Alabama: school districts · high schools
- Alaska: school districts · high schools · middle schools
- Arizona: by county: school districts · high schools · private and independent schools
- Arkansas: school districts · high schools
- California: school districts by county: school districts · high schools
- Colorado by county: school districts · high schools
- Connecticut: school districts · high schools
- Delaware by county: school districts · high schools
- District of Columbia: public schools · high schools
- Florida: school districts · high schools
  - List of schools in Coral Springs, Florida
- Georgia: all schools · school districts · high schools
- Hawaii: public schools · high schools
  - Schools of Hilo, Hawaii

== I–M ==
- Idaho: school districts · high schools
- Illinois by county: school districts · high schools
- Indiana by county: school districts · high schools
- Iowa by county: school districts · high schools · private schools
- Kansas: school districts · high schools
- Kentucky: school districts · high schools · middle schools
- Louisiana: school districts · high schools
- Maine: school districts · high schools
- Maryland: school districts · high schools
  - List of schools in Montgomery County, Maryland
- Massachusetts: school districts · high schools
- Michigan: school districts · high schools
- Minnesota: school districts · high schools
- Mississippi: school districts · high schools · private schools
- Missouri: school districts · high schools
- Montana by county: school districts · high schools

== N–P ==
- Nebraska by county: school districts · high schools
- Nevada: school districts · high schools
- New Jersey by county: school districts · high schools
- New Hampshire: school districts · high schools
- New Mexico: school districts · high schools
- New York: school districts · high schools
  - List of schools in the Roman Catholic Archdiocese of New York
- North Carolina: school districts · high schools · middle schools · elementary schools
  - List of Raleigh public schools · List of schools in Charlotte, North Carolina
- North Dakota by county: school districts · high schools · defunct high schools
- Ohio by county: school districts · high schools
- Oklahoma: school districts · high schools
  - List of schools in Tulsa, Oklahoma
- Oregon: school districts · high schools
- Pennsylvania: school districts · high schools

== R–Z ==
- Rhode Island: school districts · high schools
- South Carolina: school districts · high schools
  - List of schools in Charleston, South Carolina
- South Dakota: school districts · high schools
- Tennessee: school districts · high schools
- Texas: school districts · high schools
- Utah: school districts · high schools
- Vermont: school districts · high schools
- Virginia: school districts · high schools
- Washington: school districts · high schools · private schools
- West Virginia: school districts · high schools
- Wisconsin: school districts · high schools
- Wyoming: school districts · high schools

== Insular areas ==
- American Samoa: public schools
- Guam: all schools · public schools
- Northern Mariana Islands: public schools
- Puerto Rico: all schools · high schools · elementary schools
  - Puerto Rico Department of Education
- United States Virgin Islands: St. Thomas-St. John School District · St. Croix School District

== See also ==
- Education in the United States
- List of Baptist schools in the United States
- List of boarding schools in the United States
- List of defunct military academies in the United States
- List of independent Catholic schools in the United States
- List of international schools in the United States
- List of Lutheran schools in the United States
- List of medical schools in the United States
- List of the oldest public high schools in the United States
