= Concordia Preparatory School =

Concordia Preparatory School may refer to one of the following schools:

- Concordia Preparatory School (Maryland), formerly Baltimore Lutheran School
- Concordia Preparatory School (Utah), formerly Salt Lake Lutheran High School
