= Concordia, Missouri =

City in Lafayette County, Missouri, United States

- City
- City of Concordia
- Location of Concordia, Missouri
- Coordinates: 38°59′16″N 93°34′06″W
- Country: United States
- State: Missouri
- County: Lafayette

Area
  - Total: 1.84 sq mi (4.76 km^{2})
  - Land: 1.83 sq mi (4.74 km^{2})
  - Water: 0.0077 sq mi (0.02 km^{2})
- Elevation: 781 ft (238 m)

Population (2020)
  - Total: 2,371
  - Density: 1,294.4/sq mi (499.77/km^{2})
- Time zone: UTC-6 (Central (CST))
  - Summer (DST): UTC-5 (CDT)
- ZIP code: 64020
- Area code: 660
- FIPS code: 29-16102
- GNIS feature ID: 2393617
- Website: www.concordiamo.org

Concordia is a city in Lafayette County, Missouri, United States, that is part of the Kansas City metropolitan area. The population was 2,371 at the 2020 census.

== History ==
Concordia was platted in 1868. The city was named after a place mentioned in the poem "Das Lied von der Glocke" by Friedrich Schiller. A post office called Concordia has been in operation since 1865.

A large share of the early settlers were Germans. Among these immigrants were ancestors of scientist Linus Pauling. In 1842, Christoph Friedrich Pauling, his wife Catharine and their daughters Rebecca and Charlotte immigrated to the United States from Hanover, with a son being born while they were crossing the Atlantic; they travelled to "a German settlement in Concordia, Missouri", near where they farmed; a second son was born in 1844 and their third and final son, Charles Henry (grandfather of Linus Pauling) was born in 1847.

== Geography ==
According to the United States Census Bureau, the city has a total area of 1.79 square miles (4.64 km^{2}), of which 1.78 square miles (4.61 km^{2}) is land and 0.01 square miles (0.03 km^{2}) is water.

== Demographics ==
Historical population
| Census | Pop. | Note | %± |
|---|---|---|---|
| 1880 | 391 | | — |
| 1890 | 715 | | 82.9% |
| 1900 | 889 | | 24.3% |
| 1910 | 931 | | 4.7% |
| 1920 | 962 | | 3.3% |
| 1930 | 1,140 | | 18.5% |
| 1940 | 1,077 | | −5.5% |
| 1950 | 1,218 | | 13.1% |
| 1960 | 1,471 | | 20.8% |
| 1970 | 1,854 | | 26.0% |
| 1980 | 2,129 | | 14.8% |
| 1990 | 2,160 | | 1.5% |
| 2000 | 2,360 | | 9.3% |
| 2010 | 2,450 | | 3.8% |
| 2020 | 2,371 | | −3.2% |
U.S. Decennial Census

=== 2020 census ===
As of the 2020 census, Concordia had a population of 2,371. The median age was 41.8 years. 22.6% of residents were under the age of 18 and 21.3% of residents were 65 years of age or older. For every 100 females there were 91.4 males, and for every 100 females age 18 and over there were 86.8 males age 18 and over.

0.0% of residents lived in urban areas, while 100.0% lived in rural areas.

There were 1,002 households in Concordia, of which 28.6% had children under the age of 18 living in them. Of all households, 45.5% were married-couple households, 17.1% were households with a male householder and no spouse or partner present, and 31.6% were households with a female householder and no spouse or partner present. About 36.6% of all households were made up of individuals and 17.4% had someone living alone who was 65 years of age or older.

There were 1,101 housing units, of which 9.0% were vacant. The homeowner vacancy rate was 1.8% and the rental vacancy rate was 9.9%.

Racial composition as of the 2020 census
| Race | Number | Percent |
|---|---|---|
| White | 2,178 | 91.9% |
| Black or African American | 8 | 0.3% |
| American Indian and Alaska Native | 4 | 0.2% |
| Asian | 8 | 0.3% |
| Native Hawaiian and Other Pacific Islander | 0 | 0.0% |
| Some other race | 17 | 0.7% |
| Two or more races | 156 | 6.6% |
| Hispanic or Latino (of any race) | 68 | 2.9% |

=== 2010 census ===
As of the census of 2010, there were 2,450 people, 1,002 households, and 645 families living in the city. The population density was 1,376.4 inhabitants per square mile (531.4/km^{2}). There were 1,131 housing units at an average density of 635.4 per square mile (245.3/km^{2}). The racial makeup of the city was 97.7% White, 0.2% African American, 0.2% Native American, 0.2% Asian, 0.1% Pacific Islander, 0.4% from other races, and 1.1% from two or more races. Hispanic or Latino of any race were 2.1% of the population.

There were 1,002 households, of which 32.4% had children under the age of 18 living with them, 49.1% were married couples living together, 11.7% had a female householder with no husband present, 3.6% had a male householder with no wife present, and 35.6% were non-families. 30.7% of all households were made up of individuals, and 18.8% had someone living alone who was 65 years of age or older. The average household size was 2.37 and the average family size was 2.94.

The median age in the city was 40.2 years. 25.3% of residents were under the age of 18; 6.9% were between the ages of 18 and 24; 22.9% were from 25 to 44; 22.4% were from 45 to 64; and 22.7% were 65 years of age or older. The gender makeup of the city was 46.0% male and 54.0% female.

=== 2000 census ===
As of the census of 2000, there were 2,360 people, 929 households, and 614 families living in the city. The population density was 1,404.0 inhabitants per square mile (542.1/km^{2}). There were 1,006 housing units at an average density of 598.5 per square mile (231.1/km^{2}). The racial makeup of the city was 98.56% White, 0.42% African American, 0.04% Native American, 0.17% Asian, and 0.81% from two or more races. Hispanic or Latino of any race were 0.72% of the population.

There were 929 households, out of which 29.3% had children under the age of 18 living with them, 54.6% were married couples living together, 9.3% had a female householder with no husband present, and 33.8% were non-families. 31.1% of all households were made up of individuals, and 16.4% had someone living alone who was 65 years of age or older. The average household size was 2.38 and the average family size was 2.98.

In the city the population was spread out, with 23.5% under the age of 18, 7.7% from 18 to 24, 25.4% from 25 to 44, 18.8% from 45 to 64, and 24.7% who were 65 years of age or older. The median age was 40 years. For every 100 females, there were 82.2 males. For every 100 females age 18 and over, there were 76.4 males.

The median income for a household in the city was $33,906, and the median income for a family was $43,605. Males had a median income of $30,302 versus $20,068 for females. The per capita income for the city was $16,813. About 8.0% of families and 10.0% of the population were below the poverty line, including 14.6% of those under age 18 and 8.1% of those age 65 or over.

== Education ==
It is in the Concordia R-II School District. Concordia R-II School District operates one public elementary school and Concordia High School.

St. Paul Lutheran High School, a private institution, is the only residential high school affiliated with the Lutheran Church–Missouri Synod in the United States.

Concordia has a public library, a branch of the Trails Regional Library.

Metropolitan Community College has the Concordia school district area in its service area, but not its in-district taxation area.

== Arts and culture ==
The annual Fall Festival is held the first weekend after Labor Day, with the CCC Parade (Concordia Comical Crew) held on Friday night.

== Notable people ==
- Dugan Ashley – creator of CarniK Con
- Kathryn Kuhlman (9 May 1907 – 20 February 1976), Bible teacher and evangelist

== See also ==
- List of cities in Missouri
