= List of independent Catholic schools in the United States =

Independent Catholic schools are Catholic primary, secondary schools or colleges that are not operated by a parish or religious order as well as own, fund, and operate themselves. Also included are such schools which seek to teach the Catholic faith but which, lacking approval of the local bishop, are not entitled to call themselves Catholic.

== Alaska ==
- Holy Rosary Academy, Anchorage

== Kentucky ==
- Holy Angels Academy, Louisville

== Louisiana ==
- Brother Martin High School, New Orleans
- St. Louis Catholic High School, Lake Charles, Louisiana

== Maryland ==
- The Avalon School, Bethesda
- Brookewood School, Kensington
- Saint John's Catholic Prep, Buckeystown

== Massachusetts ==
- Magnificat Academy, Warren
- Jackson Walnut Park School, Newton

== Minnesota ==
- Providence Academy, Plymouth

== Missouri ==
- Barat Academy, Dardenne Prairie
- Notre Dame de Sion, Kansas City

== New Hampshire ==
- Holy Family Academy, Manchester
- Villa Augustina School, Goffstown

== New York ==
- School of the Holy Child, Rye

== North Carolina ==
- St. Thomas More Academy, Raleigh

== South Carolina ==
- St. Joseph's Catholic School, Greenville

== Texas ==
- St. Gabriel's Catholic School, Austin, Texas

== Virginia ==
- Front Royal
- St. Michael the Archangel High School, Fredericksburg

== Wisconsin ==
- Providence Academy, La Crosse
- St. Ambrose Academy, Madison

== Washington ==
- Emerald Heights Academy, Bellevue

== See also ==
- List of schools in the United States
- List of Baptist schools in the United States
- List of international schools in the United States
- List of Lutheran schools in the United States
