= List of schools in Hilo, Hawaii =

Hilo, Hawaii s home to a number of educational institutions, including the University of Hawaiʻi at Hilo, Hawaiʻi Community College, public schools operated by the Hawaiʻi State Department of Education, and several private schools.

In all, there are 8 public elementary schools, 2 public intermediate schools, 2 public high schools and 7 private schools in Hilo.

== Public Schools ==
PreK-6

- Chiefess Kapiʻolani Elementary
- Hilo Union Elementary

K-5

- Waiākea Elementary
- Waiākeawaena Elementary

K-6

- Keaukaha Elementary
- Kaʻūmana Elementary
- Ernest Bowen DeSilva Elementary
- Haʻaheo Elementary

6-8

- Waiākea Intermediate

7-8

- Hilo Intermediate

9-12

- Waiākea High
- Hilo High

== Private schools ==
- E Makaala School
- Haili Christian School
- Hale Aloha Nazarene School
- Kamehameha Schools Hawaii Campus
- Mauna Loa School
- St Joseph Elementary School
- St Joseph Junior/Senior High School
