= Ramona Lutheran Christian School =

Coordinates: 33°02′06.19″N 116°52′31.92″W

Location
- 520 16th Street; Ramona, California 92065; United States

Information
- School type: Private elementary school
- Religious affiliation: Lutheranism
- Denomination: Lutheran Church–Missouri Synod
- Established: 1977; 49 years ago
- Grades: PK-6
- Average class size: 10-19 students per k-6 class
- Campus size: 100 students
- Newspaper: Wings!
- Website: www.ramonalutheran.org

Ramona Lutheran Christian School was a private Lutheran elementary school in Ramona, California, United States. Established in 1977, the school served students in preschool through sixth grade and was the only private Christian school in Ramona. The school closed in 2024.

Ramona Lutheran Christian School was affiliated with the Pacific Southwest District of the Lutheran Church–Missouri Synod.

== History ==
The congregation of Ramona Lutheran Church saw a need for Christian education in the community, so the school was created in 1977.

== Campus ==
The Ramona Lutheran Christian School campus was situated on a fenced and landscaped 4-acre (16,000 m^{2}) campus on the property of Ramona Lutheran Church.

The school added a new two-classroom building in 2002 to accommodate growth.

== Extra-curricular activities ==
Ramona Lutheran Christian School participated in the San Diego Regional Lutheran Schools Annual Spelling Bee and in the Annual Regional “Eagle” math completion.
