= St. John's Lutheran Church and School (New Boston, Michigan) =

Church and school in New Boston, Michigan

Coordinates: 42°05′52.5″N 83°23′18.8″W

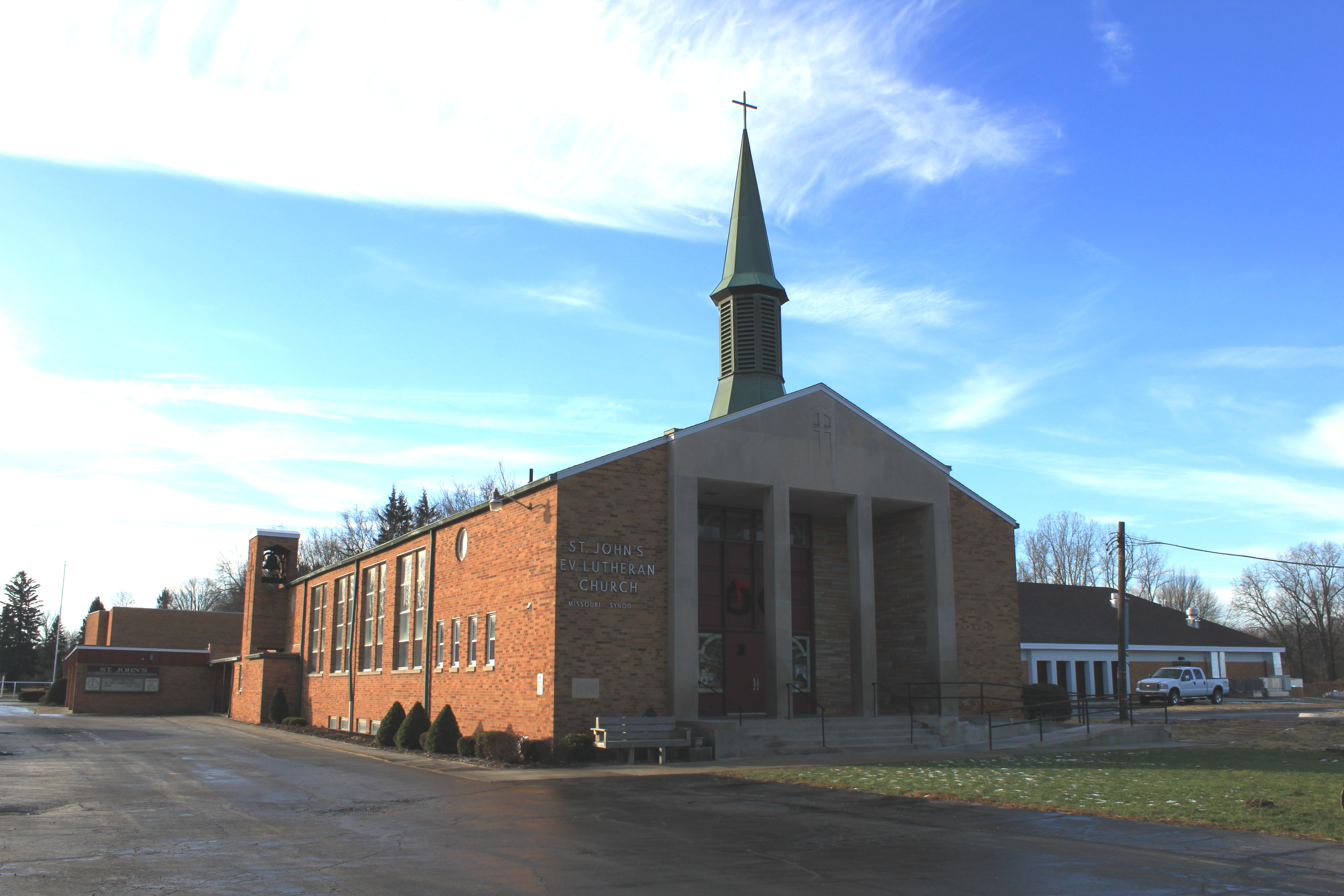
Saint John's Evangelical Lutheran Church

St. John's is a congregation of the Lutheran Church–Missouri Synod located in New Boston, Michigan. The church also operates an elementary school for children from preschool through eighth grade.

== History ==
The church has its roots in a group of German families living in Ash Township in 1856. Pastor Hermann Lemke of Raisinville Township held the first German Evangelical Lutheran service on November 23, 1856 in the home of a member of the congregation. Several months later, services were being held twice a month with all services conducted in German. The church was formally established on Easter Sunday April 13, 1857 with the official name of St. John's Evangelical Lutheran Congregation of the unaltered Augsburg Confession.

== Mission ==
St. John's mission statement reads:

"To extend to others the love God has shown to us. To follow His command, "When God's children are in need, you be the one to help them out." (Romans 12:13). To help meet spiritual and psycho-social needs of our church members, especially those with special needs, such as the homebound, ill, grieving, alone, lonely or despondent."
