= Lutheran South Academy =

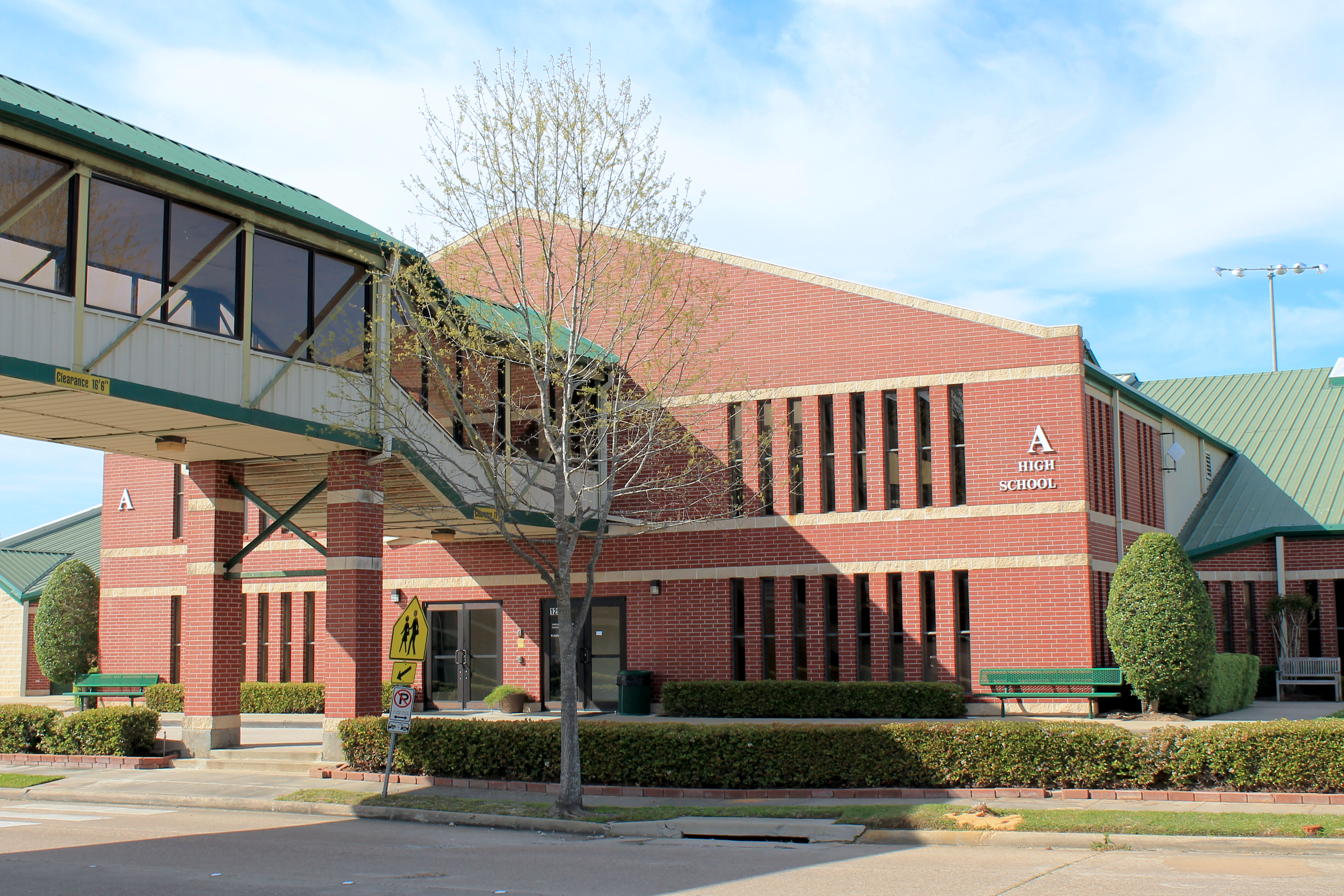
- High school building in 2014

Location
- 12555 Ryewater Drive; Houston, Texas 77089; United States

Information
- Type: Private
- Motto: Securing Their Future
- Religious affiliation: Lutheranism
- Denomination: Lutheran Church–Missouri Synod
- Established: 1949; 77 years ago
- Head of School: Scott Browning
- Faculty: 110
- Grades: Pre-K to 12
- Enrollment: 850
- Colors: Green and silver
- Mascot: Pioneers
- Rival: Fort Bend, Concordia Lutheran Highschool
- Website: www.lutheransouth.org

Lutheran South Academy is a private pre-kindergarten through 12th grade Lutheran school affiliated with the Lutheran Church–Missouri Synod located in Houston, Texas, United States. It is a member of the Houston Area Independent Schools, a group of roughly 50 private, parochial and independent institutions in the Greater Houston area.

== History ==
In 1949, the Lutheran Education Association of Houston (LEAH) opened its first campus, Lutheran High School, at 6901 Woodridge in Houston, Texas. In 1982, as the Houston area continued to grow, Lutheran High School was closed and split into two campuses administered by LEAH. One of the schools, Lutheran High School North, was opened on 1 October 1980 at 1130 W. 34th Street on the north side of the city. The other campus, Lutheran High School South, was opened at 7703 South Loop East, near the intersection of the 610 Loop and I-45. As the need for land grew in order to continue expansion, the decision was made for the school to relocate. In 1998, the Lutheran High School South campus was moved to 12555 Ryewater Drive on the south side of Houston. As expansion of the new campus continued, the school's name was changed to Lutheran South Academy with the addition of Lower and Middle school facilities.

On March 5, 2012, Lutheran South Academy was awarded "Exemplary School" status by Christian Williams and National Lutheran Schools Accreditation Commission, one of seven Lutheran schools to receive the award in the United States, and the first in Texas.

== Campus ==
The Lutheran South Academy campus consists of five main buildings.

- Building "A" houses the high school (grades 9-12).
- Building "B" includes the cafeteria, gymnasium, athletic office and administrative offices.
- Building "C" houses the lower school (grades PreK-5).
- Building "D", the newest building on campus, houses the middle school (grades 6-8). Construction began on the building in 2007 and it was opened for the 2009-2010 school year.

== Athletics ==
=== High school ===
- Baseball (boys)
- Basketball (boys and girls)
- Cheer (girls)
- Cross country (boys and girls)
- Football (boys)
- Soccer (boys and girls)
- Softball (girls)
- Swimming (boys and girls)
- Tennis (boys and girls)
- Track and field (boys and girls)
- Volleyball (girls)

=== Middle school ===
- Baseball (boys)
- Basketball (boys and girls)
- Cheer (girls)
- Cross country (boys and girls)
- Football (boys)
- Soccer
- Softball (girls)
- Track and field (boys and girls)
- Volleyball (girls)
- Tennis (boys and girls)
- Swimming (boys and girls)
- Golf (boys and girls)

== School uniforms ==
Students are required to wear school uniforms.

== See also ==
- Christianity in Houston
