= St. Martini Lutheran School =

Lutheran school in Milwaukee, Wisconsin, United States

Location
- 1520 South 16th Street; Milwaukee, Wisconsin; United States; 43°00′55.8″N 87°55′57.6″W

Information
- Type: Private elementary/middle school
- Religious affiliation: Lutheran Church – Missouri Synod
- Established: 1883
- Grades: K–8

St. Martini Lutheran School in Milwaukee, Wisconsin, is a Lutheran school which is part of the Lutheran Church – Missouri Synod. Located in Milwaukee's South Side, the school has a large Hispanic community with 90% of the students being of Hispanic descent. The school offers kindergarten through 8th grade. This school is nationally recognized for its inner city work and prides itself on the long-standing effect it has had on the lives of its students, their families, and the wider community. The school's name comes from Martin Luther. This school focuses on reading strategies, which will help in the future professions of its students.
