= CarniK Con =

YouTube firearms comedy show

- Genre: Firearms show, comedy
- Created by: Dugan Ashley
- Directed by: Dugan Ashley
- Starring: Dugan Ashley; Randy Broshankle; Stanley Childs; Ted Craig; Archie Thorne; Ronnie (Danger) Stankowsky
- Theme music composer: Dugan Ashley
- Ending theme: "LMG (Little Machine Gun)"
- Country of origin: United States
- Original language: English

Production
- Camera setup: Canon 60D; Go Pro Hero 3+ Sony HandyCam
- Running time: Varies

Original release
- Release: October 31, 2012 – March 27, 2015

CarniK Con (Carnivorous Kinetic Concepts) was an American YouTube firearms comedy show known for its videos of firearms used in humorous scenarios and the heavy use of American symbolism. The channel debuted on Halloween 2012 and has since garnered a passionate following among gun enthusiasts across the internet. Videos typically feature Dugan Ashley and other members of CarniK Con conducting tests and evaluating firearms in unlikely, scripted scenarios. The show is typically filmed in Missouri where the group is based. CarniK Con’s video formats can range from music videos to short stories, to infomercials and 20 second shorts. The channel is also known for its firearms related meme development such as skittles and guns, SpongeBob SquarePants duct tape, Ryan Gosling and operators, and the beer company “Freedom America Ale.”

== History ==
The channel name CarniK Con was derived by Dugan Ashley, Randy Broshankle and Stanley Childs in 2012. The name is a compression of Carnivorous Kinetic Concepts. Initially, the three considered filming episodes in traditional firearms coverage fashion, without consideration of the comedy that the channel is known for. “But we did our research and thought this was the way to take things up a notch.” They began writing and filming in November 2012. Dugan Ashley also writes the music featured in their videos along with Ted Craig who joined the group and began co-writing soon after CarniK Con’s inception.

The first video the channel released is simply titled “CarniK Con Opener.” It is the opening title sequence of the show that plays at the beginning of most episodes, ending with Randy wearing American flag patterned apparel firing a machine gun with the words excellence displayed behind him. As of September 2015, CarniK Con has gained more than 77,739 subscribers, making it the 27,977th most subscribed channel on YouTube.

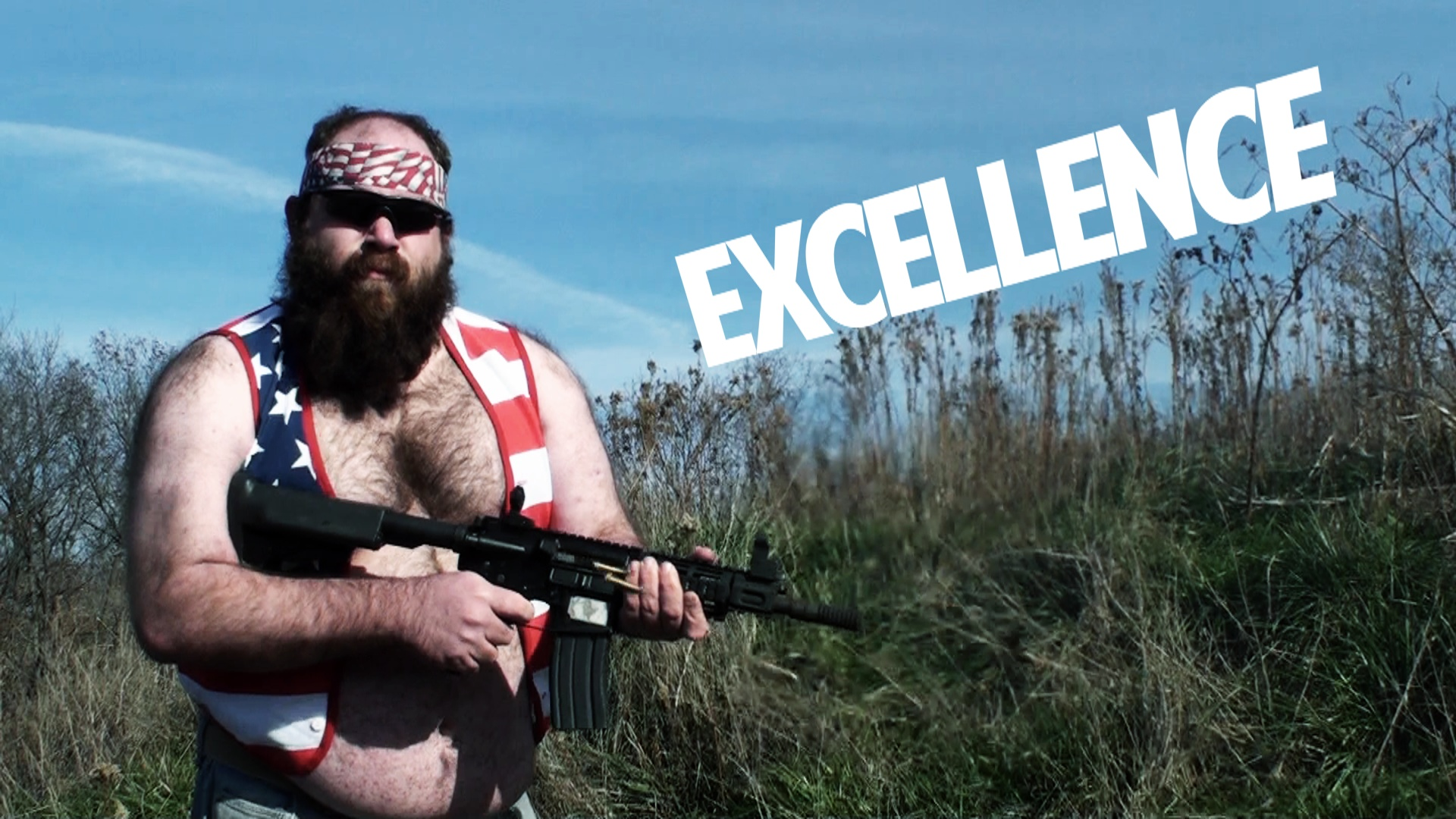
Randy Broshankle Firing a Machine Gun in the show's opening clip.

== Feud with FPS Russia ==
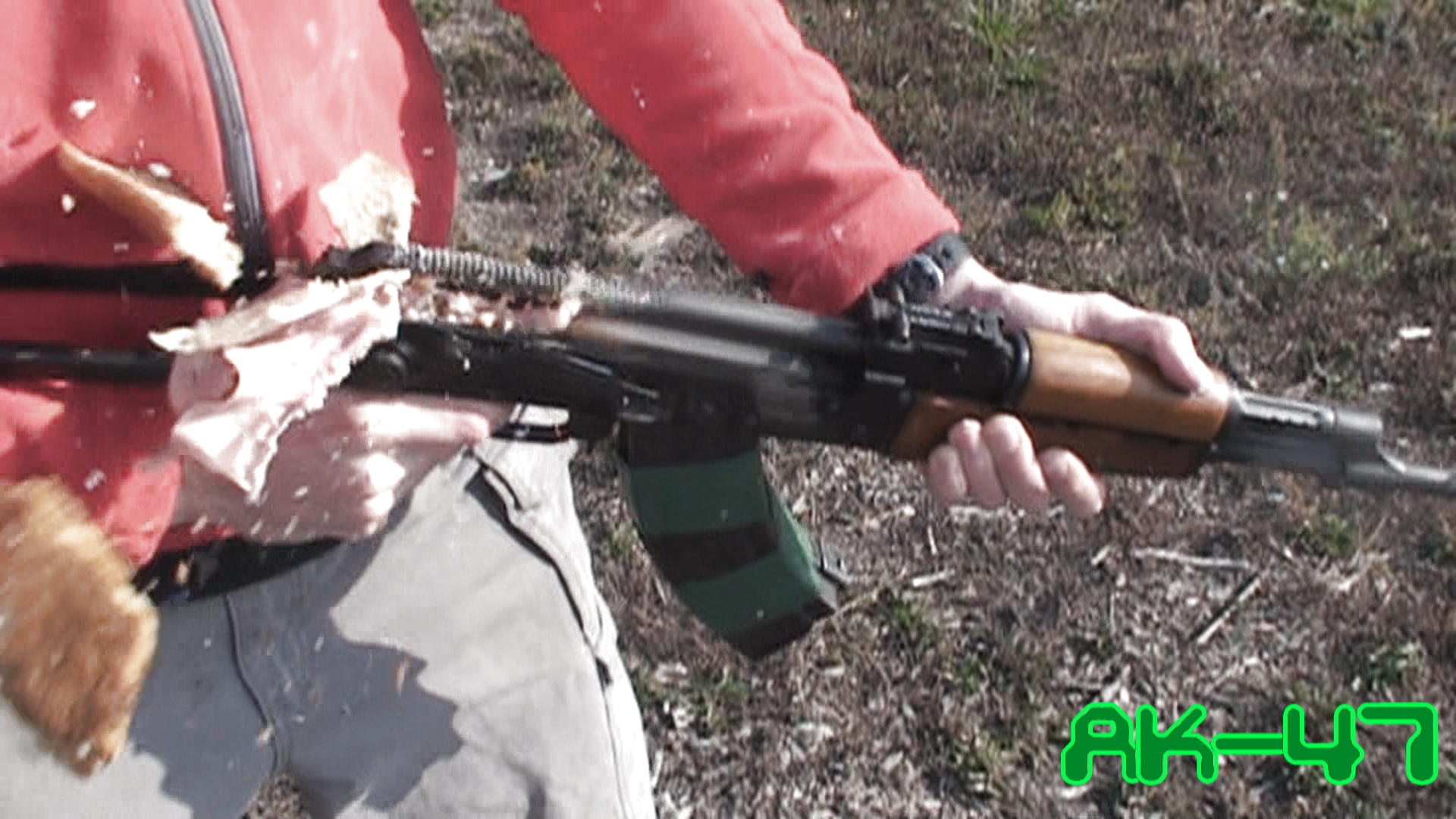
The AK-47's world-renowned reliability under intense conditions is tested to its absolute limits when Dugan Ashley places a ham sandwich within the receiver.

Upon the initial success of CarniK Con, in spring 2013 they were purportedly approached by representatives of the YouTube channel FPSRussia. During this time, FPSRussia published the video AK-47 Bacon Sundae in which an AK-47 is fired with an open receiver filled with ice cream and bacon. Fans of CarniK Con accused FPSRussia of intellectual material theft from an earlier CarniK Con video AR-15 VS AK-47, Solved Once and For All; in which Ashley fires an AK-47 with a ham sandwich in the receiver. Ashley has made no comment regarding this, but ten days following the release of AK-47 Bacon Sundae, CarniK Con released the video SUPER CARBINE COURSE, in which a character resembling Dmitri Potapoff (protagonist of FPSRussia) presumably dies while attempting to conduct a “phantom reload.” At this time, there have been no collaborations between FPSRussia and CarniK Con.

== Cancellation of CarniK Con Productions ==
On March 27, 2015, Ashley posted a message to the official CarniK Con Facebook page stating that he was discontinuing production of new material.

″Pulling the plug on CarniK Con, effective immediately. Leaving Soc. Med. up, am available for hired work, [email removed]. May or may not upload most recent video to YT at some point, but won't be making new posts. This is probably the last one. #out″

Since the posting of this message there have been two new posts on the Facebook page unrelated to CarniK Con, but no new material has been posted nor have any plans to resume production of new videos.

On January 5, 2016, Group Coalition made a short podcast interviewing Dugan Ashley about Carnik Con.

On September 7, 2017, the CarniK Con channel was removed from YouTube. However, the content remains available on Archive.org, and several fans of the channel have created mirrors on YouTube.

On February 18, 2018, Dugan Ashley was featured as a guest on ‘InRangeTV’, a show run on YouTube collaboratively run by Karl K. Kasarda and Ian McCollum of Forgotten Weapons, another popular YouTube firearms channel. There has been no confirmation of a Carnik Con return, despite several mentions of the original channel during the video.

== Merchandise ==
In December 2013, CarniK Con released a limited run of MIL-SPEC AR-15 Receivers featuring their logo (A creature formed by a collage of weapons known as ‘The Gun Dragon’). They were numbered from 0 to 300 and sold through the firearms manufacturer Palmetto State Defense.

== Gallery ==
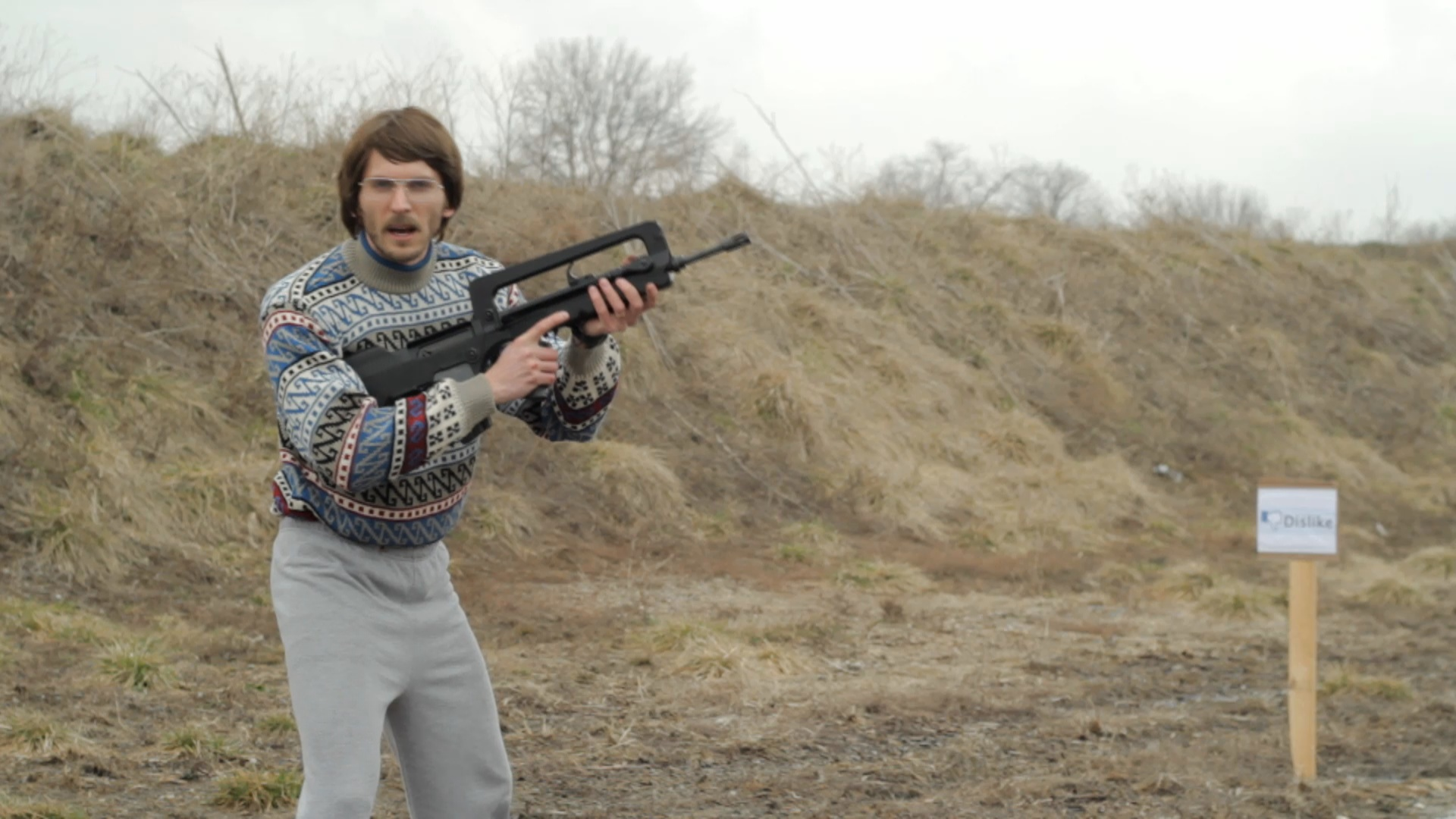
Dugan Displays the FAMAS Rifle
