= Saint Mark's Lutheran School and Church (Milford, Ohio) =

Saint Mark's Lutheran School

Location
- Milford, Ohio; United States
- Coordinates: 39°11′17.0″N 84°13′07.1″W

Information
- Type: Preschool, Grade School
- Motto: "Connecting students with Jesus while providing excellence in education"
- Opened: January 1997
- School district: LCMS-OH
- Principal: Timothy Kollmorgen
- Grades: 2 Years-8th
- Color(s): Purple and Gold
- Team name: Saint Mark's Saints
- Website: www.stmarksmilford.org

Saint Mark's Lutheran School and Church is an LCMS church and school in Milford, Ohio. The school serves Preschool 2 year olds through 8th graders and was established January 1997.

== Awards ==
The school earned trophies in Science Olympiad regional competitions three times, fifth place once and sixth place twice. The school also has two bronze Healthy Buckeye Awards and one silver Healthy Buckeye Award. It is also an NLSA accredited school.
