= West Michigan Lutheran High School =

Location
- 150 50th Street SW; Wyoming, Michigan 49548; United States
- 42°54′01″N 85°40′49″W

Information
- Type: Private
- Established: 2004
- NCES School ID: A0502027
- Principal: Kristine Angers
- Teaching staff: 5.4 (on an FTE basis)
- Grades: 7–12
- Enrollment: 24 (2015–2016)
- Student to teacher ratio: 4.4
- Colors: Navy and white
- Nickname: Mustangs
- Website: www.wmlhs.org

West Michigan Lutheran High School is a Lutheran high school in Wyoming, Michigan, United States.

It was started in the fall of 2004 with 10 students who were freshmen and sophomores. Its first location was in the Ministry Center Building of St. Mark Lutheran Church of Kentwood, Michigan. In the spring of 2007, WMLHS held its first graduation. In the summer of 2025, the school moved to Grace Lutheran Church on 50th Street.

== Demographics ==
The demographic breakdown of the 24 students enrolled in 2015-2016 was:

- Asian/Pacific islanders - 12.5%
- Black - 8.3%
- White - 70.8%
- Multiracial - 8.3%

== Athletics ==
The WMLHS Mustangs are affiliated with the MHSAA. The school colors are navy blue, white and red. Boys basketball, girls bowling, boys golf, girls tennis, football, and track and field are offered.
