= Our Redeemer's Christian School (Minot, North Dakota) =

Location
- 700 16th Ave SE; Minot, North Dakota 58701-6707; United States; 48°13′03″N 101°17′02″W

Information
- Religious affiliation: Lutheranism
- Denomination: Lutheran Brethren
- Established: 1982; 44 years ago
- CEEB code: 351235
- Administrator: Bree McCarthy
- Teaching staff: 23.1 (FTE) (2017–18)
- Grades: PK–12
- Enrollment: K–12: 230 (2017–18); PK: 94 (2017–18)
- Student to teacher ratio: 10.0 (2017–18)
- Colors: Blue and white
- Athletics: NDHSAA Class B
- Mascot: Knight
- Website: orcsknights.org

Our Redeemer's Christian School is a private Lutheran school in Minot, North Dakota. Founded in 1982, the school serves students in preschool through grade 12 and shares a building with Our Redeemer's Lutheran Brethren Church.

== History ==
Our Redeemer's Lutheran Brethren Church began a kindergarten program in 1976, which led to the establishment of Our Redeemer's Christian School in 1982 with fifteen students. The school became a K-8 program in 1983 and a high school program was added in 1995.

The school is a member of the Association of Christian Schools International (ACSI).

== Campus ==
The school has been housed with the church since the program's establishment. A new classroom and gymnasium building was dedicated in May 2001. The administrative offices, classroom space, chapel, and foyer were renovated in 2009.

== Curriculum ==
The school places a strong focus on a biblical-based curriculum and teaching staff. Our Redeemer's Christian School was also one of the first schools in the state of North Dakota to implement a 7-12 grade Personal Learning Device initiative, with all students being issued their own tablet.

== Extracurricular activities ==
Student activities include band, choir and student congress. The school's athletic teams, known as the Knights, compete in basketball, football (cooperatively with Bishop Ryan Catholic School), golf, and volleyball. Students may participate in other sports cooperatively with Minot Public Schools.
