= Christ Lutheran High School =

Location
- 201 West Lincoln; Buckley, Illinois 60918; United States
- Coordinates: 39.766555°N 86.441277°W

Information
- School type: private secondary
- Principal: Sandra J. Spitz
- Staff: 2
- Faculty: 3
- Grades: 9–12
- Gender: coed
- Enrollment: 26
- Website: http://www.christlutheranbuckley.com/

Christ Lutheran High School is a high school located in Buckley, Illinois. For the 2011–2012 school year, the enrollment was 26. The school employs three teachers, two support staff, and one administrator.
