= West St. Paul =

West St. Paul can refer to:

- West St. Paul, Manitoba, Canada
- West St. Paul, Minnesota, United States
