= Pine Street School New York =

Coordinates: 40.7064°N 74.08°W

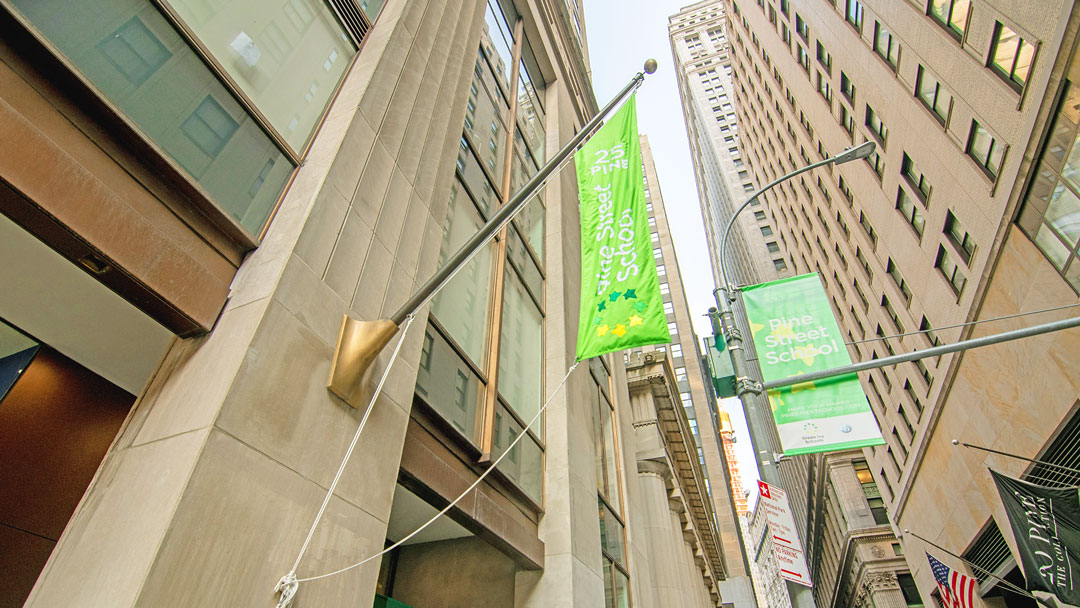
Pine Street School

Location
- 25 Pine Street; Manhattan, New York City, New York; United States

Information
- School type: Private for-profit, Independent, Coeducational, IB Primary Years Programme, Dual Language, International
- Established: 2014
- Founder: Jennifer Jones
- Head of School: Anna Rita Pergolizzi-Wentworth
- Grades: Nursery through Grade 8
- Tuition: ~$55,620
- Website: pinestreetschool.com

Pine Street School is a for-profit co-ed international school for children ages 12 months through 14 years old, and is an authorized International Baccalaureate Primary Years Programme. The school opened in September 2014 in New York City in the Financial District neighborhood. Pine Street School offers a dual language immersion program in Spanish and Mandarin.

Pine Street School features the following programs: the nursery program (One through two-year-olds), Preschool (ages 3 and 4), Elementary School (Kindergarten through 5th grade), and Middle School (6th - 8th grade).

== Leadership team ==
Pine Street School’s Head of School is Anna Rita Pergolizzi-Wentworth.

In 2022, Lauren Angarola became the Middle School coordinator at Pine Street School.

Simone Becker is the IB Coordinator.

== New York City campus ==
Pine Street School is located in New York’s Financial District at 25 Pine Street, and occupies the first four floors of the building also known as 40 Wall Street, a 71-story neo-gothic skyscraper between Nassau Street and William Street in Manhattan, New York City designed by H. Craig Severance, along with Yasuo Matsui (associate architect), and Shreve & Lamb (consulting architects). Pine Street School occupies 85,000 square feet (7,896 m2) that was renovated and designed by the architectural firm Perkins Eastman, and Structure Tone (construction management).

Pine Street School opened with two programs (Nursery through Preschool) for the 2014-2015 school year. The Kindergarten, 1st, 2nd, 3rd, 4th and 5th grades were added over the years. In 2023, Pine Street School expanded to include a Nursery Ones program and a Middle School, beginning with 6th grade and has continued to add 7th and 8th grades in subsequent school years. In addition to its program expansion, Pine Street School added an Arts & Athletics Center for co-curricular and competitive team sports activities.

== Memberships/Affiliations ==
- The International Baccalaureate Organization
- New England Association of Schools and Colleges
- New York State Montessori Alliance
- Parents League of New York
- Common Ground Collaborative
- International Schools Services
- Search Associates
- Association for the Advancement of International Education
- Guild of International Baccalaureate Schools Northeast
