= Illinois Lutheran High School =

Location
- 1610 Main Street; Crete, Illinois 60417; United States
- Coordinates: 41.5138°N 87.9298°W

Information
- Grades: 9–12
- Enrollment: 128 (2018)
- Area: South Suburbs
- Color
- Team name: Chargers
- Website: www.ilhs.org

Illinois Lutheran High School, or ILHS, is a private, nationally accredited Christian school in Crete, Illinois, a south suburb of Chicago.

Illinois Lutheran High School serves students from the south, central and eastern region of Will County. This includes Crete, Monee, Wilmington, Peotone, and Washington townships in Will County.
