= Lutheran High School East =

Location
- 3565 Mayfield Road; Cleveland Heights, (Cuyahoga County), Ohio 44118; United States
- Coordinates: 41°31′16″N 81°33′4″W

Information
- Type: Private, Coeducational high school
- Religious affiliation: Lutheran Church–Missouri Synod
- Opened: 1959
- Superintendent: Chris Steinmann
- Principal: Matthew Luecke
- Grades: 9-12
- Colors: Blue and White
- Mascot: Falcon
- Team name: Falcons
- Accreditation: North Central Association of Colleges and Schools
- Website: www.lutheraneast.org

Lutheran High School East is a private high school for grades 9–12 located in Cleveland Heights, Ohio. It is affiliated with the Lutheran Church – Missouri Synod. Their nickname is the Falcons and compete as a member school of the Ohio High School Athletic Association.

== History ==
The original high school, Lutheran High School, opened in 1948. Due to the proposed Innerbelt Freeway, the school decided to split into two separate high schools, Lutheran East and Lutheran West in 1956.

Classes were temporarily held at Park Synagogue until 1959 as the new Mayfield Road building was being constructed. Lutheran East officially opened in 1959, welcoming its first 265 students.

== Ohio High School Athletic Association state championships ==
- Boys' Basketball - 2005*, 2017, 2021, 2023, 2024, 2025, 2026
- Boys' Track and Field – 1971

*2005 Boys Basketball State championship game was forfeited by Columbus Africentric due to having an ineligible transfer student on the roster. Their entire 2005 season was forfeited, including the state championship.

== Notable alumni ==
- Will Felder - basketball player
