= Lincoln Lutheran Middle/High School =

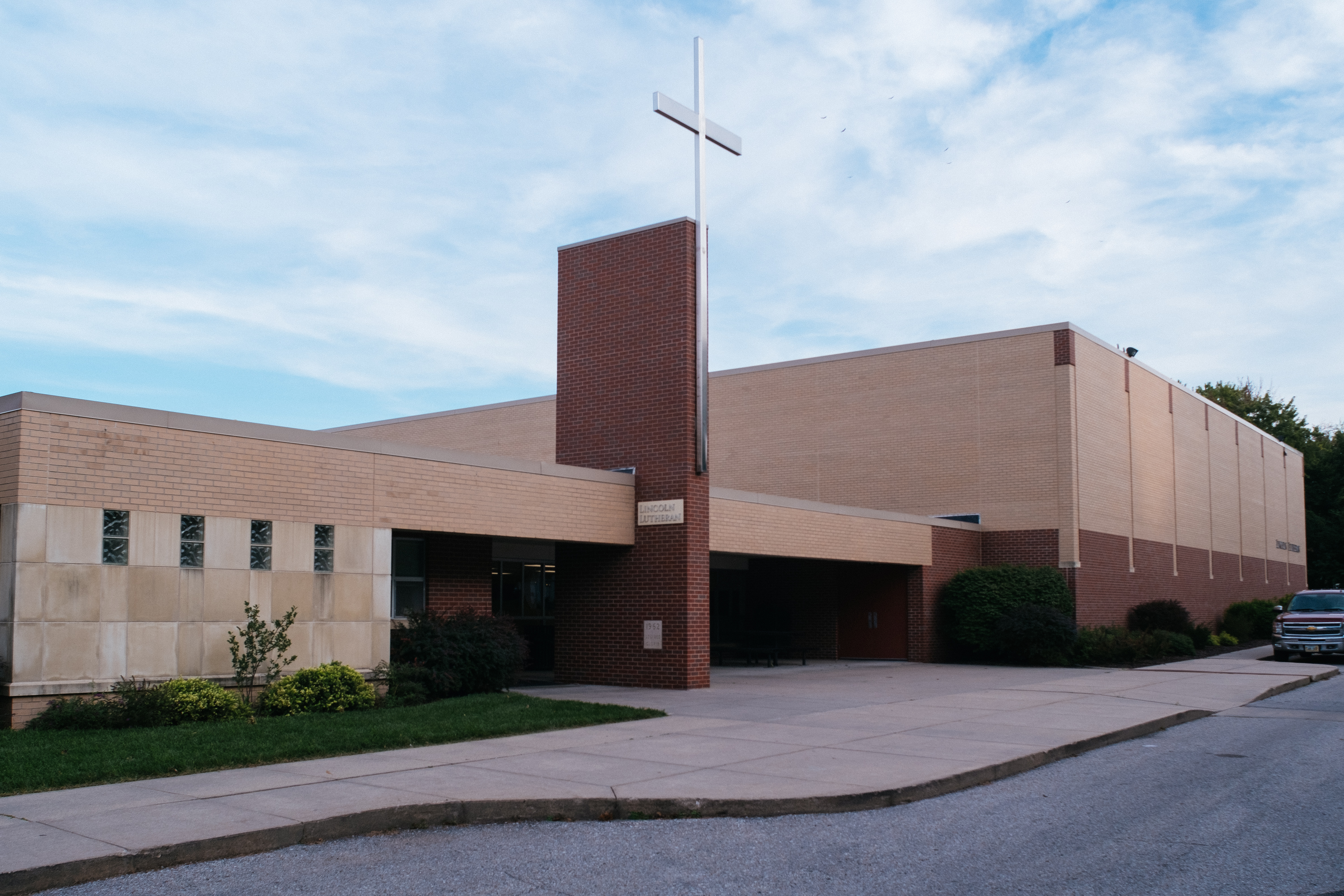

Location
- 1100 North 56th Street; Lincoln, Nebraska; United States; 40°49′27″N 96°38′36″W

Information
- Other name: Lincoln Lutheran
- Religious affiliation: Lutheranism
- Denomination: Lutheran Church–Missouri Synod
- Established: 1962; 64 years ago
- Principal: Sheila Psencik
- Faculty: 30
- Grades: 6–12
- Enrollment: 340
- Colors: Navy and Vegas gold
- Team name: Warriors
- Accreditations: Nebraska Department of Education; National Lutheran School Accreditation; AdvancedED
- Website: lincolnlutheran.org

Lincoln Lutheran Middle/High School, abbreviated as Lincoln Lutheran, is a private Lutheran middle school and high school in Lincoln, Nebraska, in the United States. Established in 1962, the school is operated by the Lincoln Lutheran School Association, which is composed of seven Lutheran congregations in the Lincoln area. It is accredited by the Nebraska Department of Education (NDE), National Lutheran School Accreditation, and AdvancedED. It is also affiliated with the Lutheran Church–Missouri Synod (LCMS).

== History ==
Lincoln Lutheran began as a junior high school in 1962, initially offering grades seven, eight, and nine. In 1994 the congregations of the Lincoln Lutheran School Association voted to expand Lutheran education in Lincoln beyond the ninth grade in support of a full, senior high school. In the fall of 1995, tenth grade was added, with the subsequent grades following annually. 1998 marked the high school's first graduating class. In 2005, despite resistance from congregations of the Lincoln Lutheran School Association with elementary schools, sixth grade was added to make a full middle school.

The member congregations of the Lincoln Lutheran School Association which have elementary schools and act as feeders for Lincoln Lutheran Middle/High School include Christ Lutheran, Faith Evangelical Lutheran, Messiah Lutheran, and Trinity Lutheran.

Lincoln Lutheran offers a traditional high school curriculum, along with multiple advanced and college-credit classes. The curriculum includes courses in physics, chemistry, biology, calculus, statistics, algebra, United States history, government, business, journalism, sociology, Spanish, English, and art. In addition to dedicated core curriculum, religion is integrated into the academic curriculum, with students being required to take religion courses and attend chapel services. Chapel services are held twice a week. Students also have the opportunity to lead chapel services for the Association Lutheran elementary schools.

Extracurricular programs are a large part of student life, with most students participating in at least one such activity. Lincoln Lutheran's extracurricular activities have a history of being successful, with multiple state championships and state tournament appearances, conference championships, and other accolades. These activities include sports, dance, cheer, choir, speech, drama, Future Business Leaders of America (FBLA), and Fellowship of Christian Athletes (FCA).

== Athletics ==
Lincoln Lutheran High School athletic teams participate in Class C-1 of the Nebraska School Activities Association in the Centennial Conference. Lincoln Lutheran's mascot is the Warrior, and its colors are navy blue and Vegas gold. Sports offered at Lincoln Lutheran include:

- Fall sports: girls' golf, boys' football, girls' volleyball, dance team, boys' and girls' cross country
- Winter sports: boys' and girls' basketball, boys' wrestling
- Spring sports: boys' golf, boys' baseball, boys' and girls' track, boys' and girls' soccer

== Fast facts ==
- 300 students in grades 6-12
- 98% of Lincoln Lutheran graduates attend college
- Average class size is 17.1.
- College preparatory curriculum with 10 dual enrollment college credit classes
- ACT scores are among the highest in the area
- 30 faculty members and administrators; 45% have a master's degree or above
- 1:1 Technology - Each student and faculty member are given use of a laptop, tablet or other device.
- 2 computer labs
