= Seattle Lutheran High School =

- Seattle, Washington; United States

Information
- Type: Private
- Established: 1978
- Closed: 2022
- Locale: Urban
- Head of School: Andie Merlino
- Faculty: 32
- Grades: 9–12
- Enrollment: 66
- Colors: Blue, White
- Mascot: Lion
- Team name: Saints
- Website: www.seattlelutheran.org

Seattle Lutheran High School was a Lutheran high school located in the West Seattle neighborhood of Seattle, Washington. It was founded in 1978.

On April 22, 2022, it was announced that Seattle Lutheran would be shut down at the end of the 2021–2022 school year.

== Sports ==
The school offered seasonal sports at the varsity, and when applicable, the junior varsity, and 'C-team' level. SLHS competed in the Seatac 1B League. Men's basketball filled the winter season, and spring sports included baseball, golf, and track and field. Cheerleading was offered during the fall and winter seasons.

The baseball team won the Washington State Championship in 2010 and 2011.

The Women's Soccer team won the State 2B title in 2010.

Seattle Lutheran participated in FIRST Robotics competitions since 2004 as Team 1258 "Seabot", making it one of the oldest FIRST teams in the region. In 2022 the Team 1258 was the victor of the PNW District Bonney Lake Event and the PNW District Auburn Event.
