= Trinity Lutheran School (Bend, Oregon) =

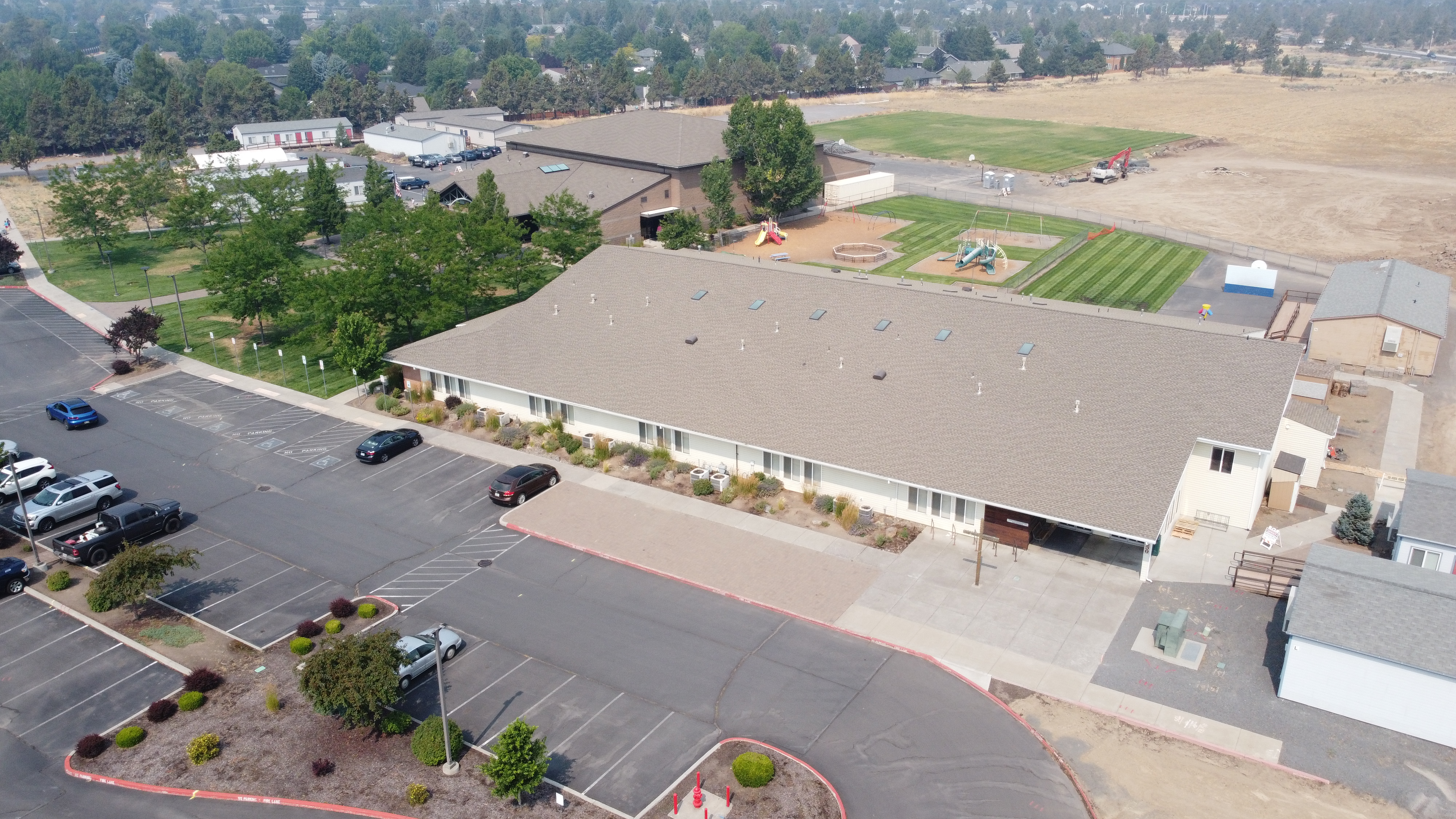
- Trinity Lutheran School in July, 2024.

Location
- 2550 NE Butler Market Rd; Bend, Deschutes County, Oregon 97701; United States
- Coordinates: 44.08493°N 121.265953°W

Information
- Type: Private
- Religious affiliation: Lutheran Church – Missouri Synod
- Opened: 1959
- Executive director: Gregg Pinick
- PS–5 principal: Lisa Gilbert
- 6–12 principal: David Haynes
- Grades: Preschool-Grade 12
- Enrollment: 645
- Colors: Navy, white, & red
- Athletics conference: OSAA Mountain Valley League 2A-5
- Mascot: The Saints
- Team name: Saints
- Website: saints.org

Trinity Lutheran School (TLS) is a private Lutheran school in Bend, Oregon, United States. It is owned and operated by Trinity Lutheran Church of the Lutheran Church – Missouri Synod. TLS serves approximately 645 students from pre-kindergarten through high school.

== History ==
Trinity opened in 1959, offering only kindergarten. In 1994 the school moved from the church property at the base of Pilot Butte onto a 23-acre (93,000 m^{2}) parcel on Butler Market Road. Having added pre-school through 5th grade in the original building, the new school building allowed TLS to add grades through grade eight. After completion of a new gymnasium, the church also moved to the property. A donation of modular class buildings allowed TLS to open a high school in 2006. Beginning with only five students, The high school graduated its first class in 2012.

== Current demographics ==
Total enrollment in preschool through grade 12 is approximate 645 students.

== Future plans ==
Trinity Lutheran Church has plans to add a new middle school and high school building, and a new sanctuary.

== Accreditation ==
Trinity Lutheran is fully accredited through both National Lutheran Schools Accreditation and AdvancED,
