= Trinity Lutheran School (Newport News, Virginia) =

Location
- 6812 River Road; Newport News, Virginia 23607; United States; 37°0′26.2″N 76°26′46.6″W

Information
- Type: Private elementary school
- Religious affiliation: Lutheranism
- Denomination: Evangelical Lutheran Church in America
- Established: 1960; 66 years ago
- Headmaster: Donna Wildemann
- Grades: Pre K - 8
- Gender: Co-educational
- Age range: 3-14
- Colors: Green and gold
- Sports: Soccer; Baseball; Basketball; Softball; Volleyball
- Mascot: Lion
- Team name: Lions
- Yearbook: Trilon
- Website: trinitynn.com

Trinity Lutheran School (TLS) is a private Lutheran elementary school in Newport News, Virginia, in the United States. Founded in 1960, the school is located adjacent to Trinity Lutheran Church and is affiliated with the Evangelical Lutheran Church in America.

== History ==
Founded on February 1, 1960, by Pastor and Mrs. Elmer Bosserman of Trinity Lutheran Church, the school has grown from the original kindergarten and first grade classrooms into its present-day campus. Facilities include an independent preschool building and a three-story building for kindergarten through eighth grade housing a library, technology lab, science lab, and a social hall/cafeteria. Expansions have included a renovated gymnasium, an outdoor classroom, an updated playground, and the addition of classrooms and resource rooms.

Affiliated with the Evangelical Lutheran Church in America, TLS operates under a Board of Trustees and a Head of School. The Board of Trustees, composed of up to eleven members from the school community, active members of Trinity Lutheran Church, and the community at large, is responsible for the direction of the school by establishing policies, creating a long range plan, and maintaining TLS's mission. The Head of School’s responsibilities include supervising daily operations, implementing policies, and upholding TLS’s academic standards.

Trinity Lutheran School is a non-profit, tax-exempt organization, which admits academically-qualified students without regard to gender, race, color, religion, and national or ethnic origin.

== Accreditations ==
=== Department of Education Blue Ribbon School 2015 ===
In September, 2015, the Department of Education named TLS a 2015 Blue Ribbon School. TLS was one of only three schools in Hampton Roads to achieve this honor in 2015.

The Department of Education invites National Blue Ribbon School nominations from the top education official in every state, the District of Columbia, Puerto Rico, the Virgin Islands, the Department of Defense Education Activity, and the Bureau of Indian Education. The Council for American Private Education (CAPE) nominates private schools. A total of 420 schools nationwide may be nominated, with allocations determined by the numbers of K-12 students and schools in each jurisdiction. The U.S. Secretary of Education invites nominated schools to submit an application for possible recognition as a National Blue Ribbon School.
