= Minnesota Valley Lutheran High School =

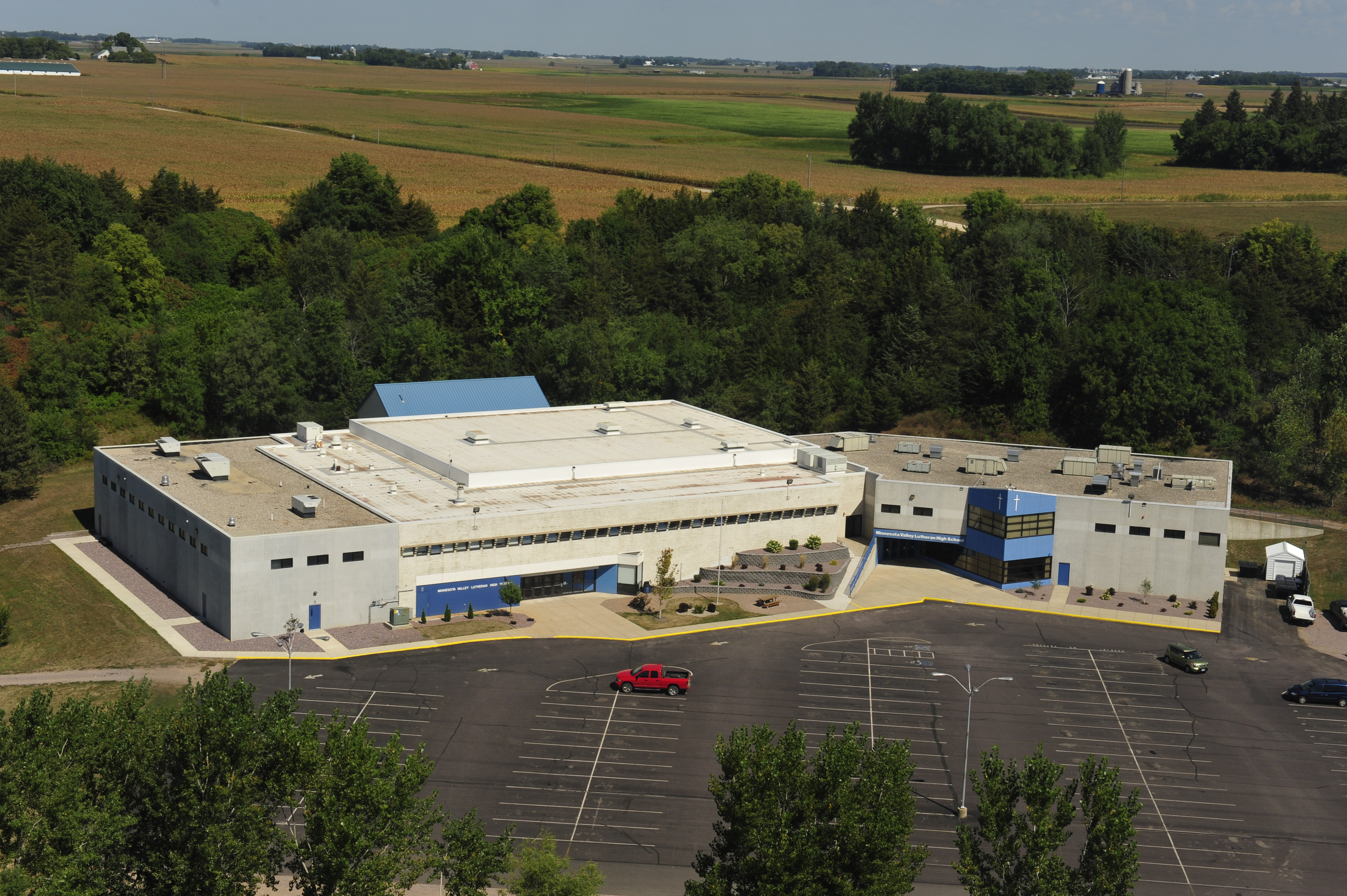
- Aerial view of Minnesota Valley Lutheran High School

Location
- 45638 561st Ave; New Ulm, Minnesota 56073
- Coordinates: 44.2886°N 94.3933°W

Information
- School type: Private high school
- Religious affiliation: Lutheran
- Denomination: Wisconsin Evangelical Lutheran Synod
- Dean: Jim Buboltz
- Principal: Tim Plath
- Grades: 9–12
- Colors: Navy blue and Columbia blue
- Athletics conference: South Central Conference (Minnesota)
- Team name: Chargers
- Rival: New Ulm Cathedral
- Newspaper: The Charger
- Yearbook: Flashback
- Website: www.mvl.org

Minnesota Valley Lutheran High School (MVL) is a private school located just outside New Ulm, Minnesota. The current building was built in 1979; the school was founded as a faith-based institution. MVL is owned by the Minnesota Valley Lutheran Association consisting of 21 congregations of the Evangelical Lutheran Synod and the Wisconsin Evangelical Lutheran Synod. Enrollment averages 200 students in grades 9 through 12.

== Sports ==
- Baseball
- Boys' basketball
- Girls' basketball
- Cross-country
- Football
- Golf
- Softball
- Track & field team
- Volleyball
- Boys' tennis (co-op)
- Girls' tennis (co-op)
- Boys' soccer (co-op)
- Girls' soccer (co-op)
- Wrestling (co-op)
- Hockey (co-op)
- Gymnastics (co-op)
- Downhill Skiing (co-op)
- Curling (co-op)
