= Arizona Lutheran Academy =

Wisconsin Synod Lutheran high school in Phoenix, Arizona

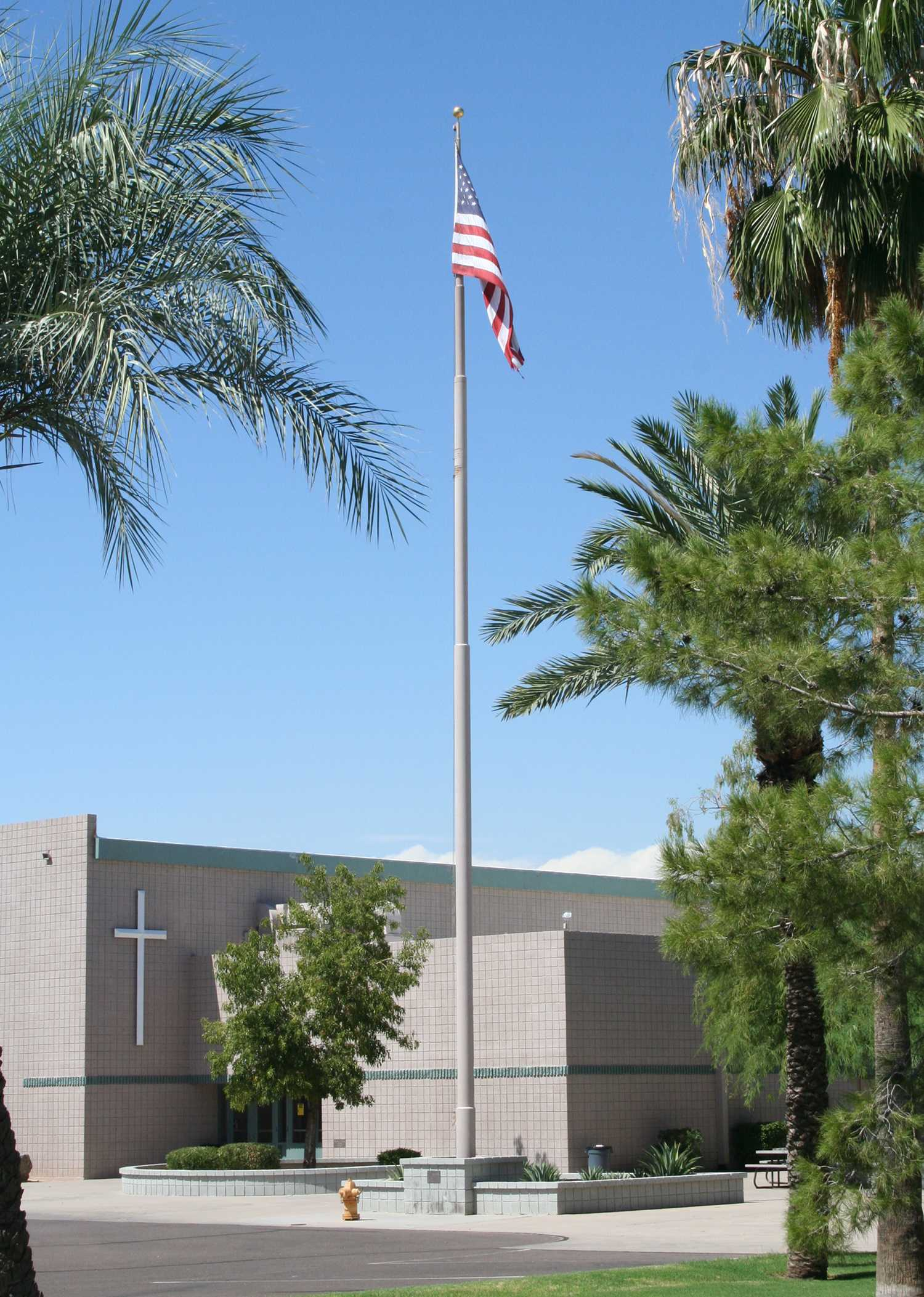

Location
- 6036 South 27th Avenue; Phoenix, Arizona 85041; United States; 33°23′28″N 112°07′04″W

Information
- Type: Private secondary
- Established: 1978
- Principal: Kurt Rosenbaum
- Faculty: 20
- Grades: 9–12
- Enrollment: 182 (October 1, 2012)
- Colors: Black; Gold
- Mascot: Coyotes
- Website: alacoyotes.org

Arizona Lutheran Academy (ALA) is a high school located in Phoenix, Arizona. The school is affiliated with the Wisconsin Evangelical Lutheran Synod (WELS). ALA was founded in 1978 and has been located in its present 18-acre (73,000 m^{2}) campus since 1986.

ALA is fully accredited by the North Central Association of Accreditation and School Improvement.

The school's mascot is the coyote and its colors are black and gold. ALA is a member of the 2A Conference of the Arizona Interscholastic Association.

== Sports ==
=== Basketball ===
ALA won the 1A boys' basketball championship in 1999 under coach Doug Meyer. ALA was also 2A runners-up in 1987 under coach Norman Tech and in 2005, 2006, 2012 and 2013 under Meyer.

ALA won the 2A girls' basketball championship in 1991 under coach Bob Gruetzmacher, who had taken the team to the title game the year before and lost.

=== Football ===
ALA won the 1A football championship in 1992 under coach Doug Lange, who led the team to an undefeated season. ALA was also 2A runners-up in 2005 and 2007 under coach Doug Meyer.

=== Track and field ===
In 1998, ALA won the 1A girls' track and field title under coach Joan Tierney. Coach Tierney also led the Coyotes to runners-up positions in 1993, 1994, and 1999, while the team also tied for second in 2012.

Tierney also coached the boys' team in the 1990s, leading that squad to runners-up positions in 1998 and 1999 and a third-place finish in 1997.

== See also ==
- Martin Luther College
- Lutheranism
- Laveen, Arizona
