= Lutheran High School of Hawaii =

Location
- 1404 University Avenue; Honolulu, Hawaii 96822; United States
- 21°17′45″N 157°49′17″W

Information
- Type: Private
- Denomination: Lutheran Church–Missouri Synod
- Established: 1970; 56 years ago
- Authority: Lutheran Schools of Hawaii
- Principal: Arthur Gundell
- Faculty: 12.0 (on FTE basis)
- Grades: 9 to 12
- Gender: Coeducational
- Enrollment: 135 (2005-06)
- Student to teacher ratio: 11.2
- Accreditation: Western Association of Schools and Colleges
- Website: http://www.lhshawaii.org/

Lutheran High School of Hawaii (LHSH) was a Lutheran High School located on the grounds of Our Redeemer Lutheran Church at 1404 University Avenue in Honolulu on Oahu, Hawaii. LHSH was accredited by the Western Association of Schools and Colleges (WASC), the Hawaii Association of Independent Schools (HAIS), and National Lutheran School Accreditation (NLSA), and was a member of the Interscholastic League of Honolulu (ILH) and PAC-5 sports programs.

The school announced its closing at the end of the 2015-16 school year.

== History ==
Lutheran High served the greater Honolulu community for over 25 years. Foremost during the school's existence has been a dedication to provide a quality, Christ-centered education for the children of Hawaii.

Lutheran High's story began in 1942 when a group of civilians and servicemen with the help of the Lutheran Church–Missouri Synod opened a small mission Service Center on Lunalilo Street in Honolulu. A few years later, the mission group established Our Redeemer Lutheran Church and moved to a small building on Young Street owned by Kawaiahaʻo Church.

In 1947, Our Redeemer Lutheran School was started in the basement of the building on Young Street. That first year the school consisted of Kindergarten and first grade. Eager to provide a permanent home for the church and to meet the needs of a growing elementary school enrollment, the church purchased property on University Avenue in 1949 and constructed the present chapel, offices, and three classrooms. By 1950, the school had an enrollment of twenty-nine students in Kindergarten through grade three. Two more classrooms were added in 1952.

By 1959, Our Redeemer Lutheran Church became a self-supporting congregation of the Lutheran Church–Missouri Synod. In this capacity, Our Redeemer Lutheran Church, no longer receiving mission support, became the sole provider for the school.

A complete elementary school for Kindergarten through grade eight opened in 1965. A large addition was made to the University Avenue property. The new building, immediately behind the existing structures, added seven classrooms, a library, auditorium, teachers' workroom, and a kitchen.

Four years later a high school expansion program was planned. Accordingly, during 1970–1974, grades nine through twelve were added with the first senior class of fifteen students graduating in 1975. During 1974–1982, space limitations on the University Avenue campus necessitated that the elementary school be operated from three different locations stretching from Palolo Valley to Nu'uanu Valley.

In 1977, a second parcel of land on Wilder Avenue around the corner from the University Avenue property was purchased. By 1983, a modern three-story, fourteen-room structure had been completed. This facility now houses Kindergarten through eighth grade. Concurrently with the completion of the elementary building, improvements were made to the High School on University Avenue. These included library, classroom and office improvements, and the addition of a computer center, teachers' lounge, and counseling office.

During the 1988 school year, a portable building was acquired to serve as an additional classroom. On July 1, 1988, Our Redeemer Church relinquished its sole control of the high school in order to share ownership with four other Lutheran churches - St. Mark, Messiah, Our Savior, and Trinity - thus creating an association high school association. Good Shepherd Church joined the association in 2004.

By 2016, enrollment at the school had dropped to 38 students. On April 15, 2016, the school announced that it would close at the end of the academic year.

== Mission ==
Lutheran High School of Hawaii summarized its mission with the phrase: "Educating for Life - Promoting the Faith!"
