= Great Plains Lutheran High School =

Private high school in South Dakota, United States

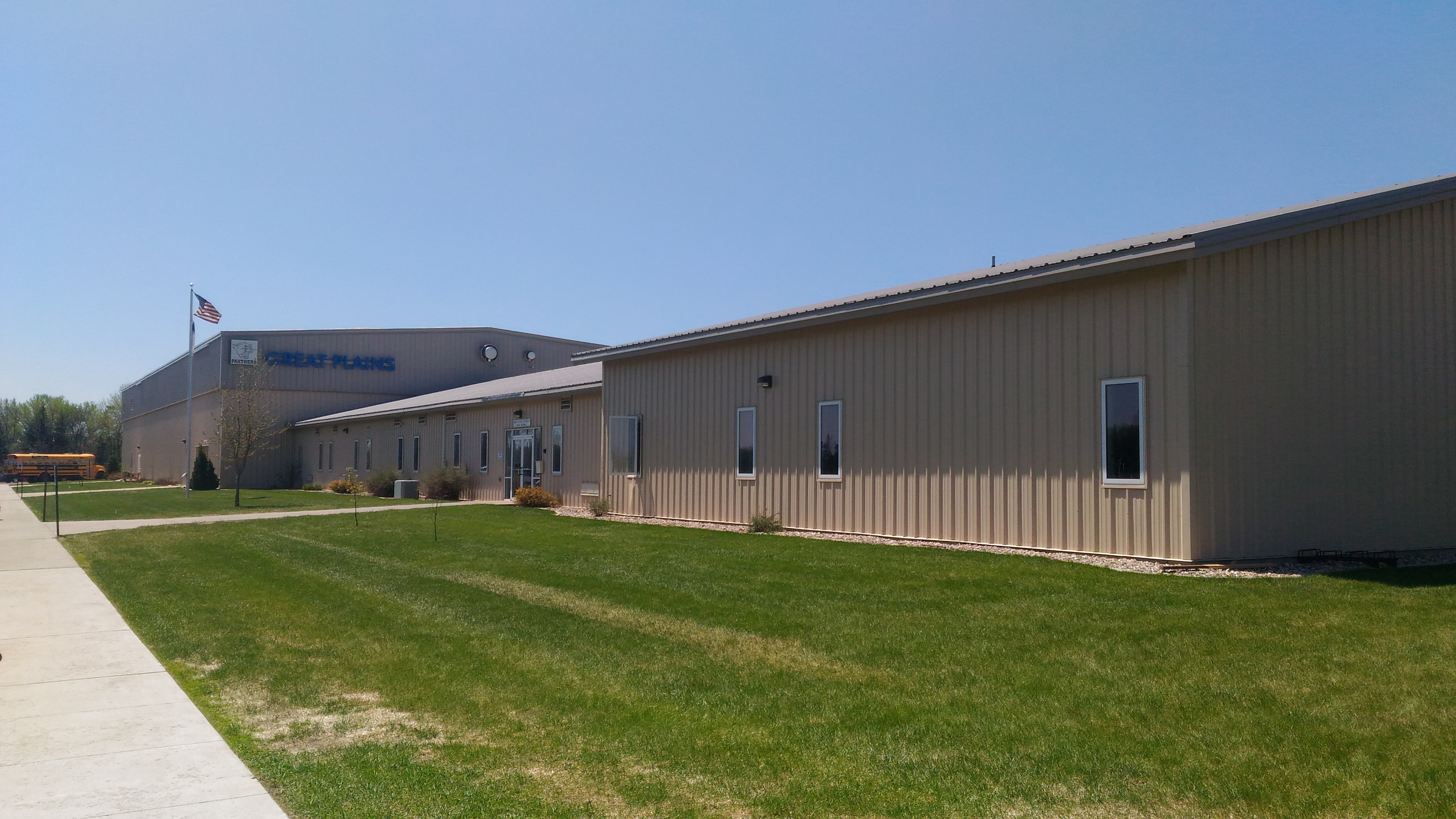
- Great Plains Lutheran High School, May 2017

Location
- 1200 Luther Lane NE; Watertown, SD 57201-8200; United States; 44°54′58″N 97°06′21″W

Information
- Type: Parochial secondary
- Established: 1996
- President: David Maertz
- Dean: Karl Schauland
- Principal: Matt Bauer
- Staff: 10
- Faculty: 13
- Grades: 9-12
- Enrollment: 131
- Colors: Navy blue and white
- Athletics conference: Eastern Coteau (ECC)
- Mascot: Panthers
- Varsity Sports: Girls - 5 & Boys - 5
- School Song: Wave the Flag
- Website: www.gplhs.org

Great Plains Lutheran High School (GPLHS) is a high school in Watertown, South Dakota, United States. It is the only private high school in Watertown. GPLHS is owned and operated by 48 congregations belonging to the Wisconsin Evangelical Lutheran Synod (WELS).
