= California Lutheran Academy =

Christian K-12 school in Wildomar, California, US

Location
- 31970 Wildomar Trail; Wildomar, California 92595; United States
- 33.6082°N 117.2680°E

Information
- Established: 1977
- Principal: Steve Rosenbaum
- Faculty: 14
- Grades: K-12
- Enrollment: 100
- Colors: Royal blue and white
- Mascot: Cecil (C-Hawk)
- Affiliation: Wisconsin Evangelical Lutheran Synod
- Website: californialutheranacademy.org

California Lutheran Academy (formerly California Lutheran High School) is a private, college-preparatory, Christian K- 12th grade school in Wildomar, California, United States. Students come from the Temecula metro area, Lake Elsinore, and other areas of Riverside County. International high school students enroll from China, South Korea, Ethiopia, Nigeria, Japan, Brazil, and Hong Kong, among others.

California Lutheran is an Area Lutheran School operated by the Wisconsin Evangelical Lutheran Synod (WELS). The school is accredited by the Accrediting Commission for Schools of the Western Association of Schools and Colleges.

== Athletics ==
California Lutheran Academy offers a variety of sports for both boys and girls. C-Hawk athletics are a part of the California Interscholastic Federation. CLA is a member of the Arrowhead League. The athletic department offers the following sports: football, girls volleyball, boys and girls cross country, boys and girls basketball, boys and girls soccer, softball, baseball, golf and boys and girls track and field.
