= Trinity Lutheran High School (Indiana) =

Location
- 1 Trinity Way; Seymour, Jackson County, Indiana 47274; United States
- 38.985775°N 85.877188°W

Information
- Type: Private school
- Religious affiliation: Lutheran Church–Missouri Synod
- Established: 2000
- Principal: Clayton Darlage
- Faculty: 12
- Grades: 9-12
- Enrollment: 133 (2020)
- Color
- Athletics conference: Independent
- Team name: Cougars
- Website: www.trinitycougars.org

Trinity Lutheran High School is a private high school in Seymour, Indiana, operated by an association of 15 congregations of the Lutheran Church–Missouri Synod. It was rated a four star school by the Indiana Department of Education in 2018.

== See also ==
- List of high schools in Indiana
