= Lutheran North Academy =

Private high school in Houston, Texas, U.S.

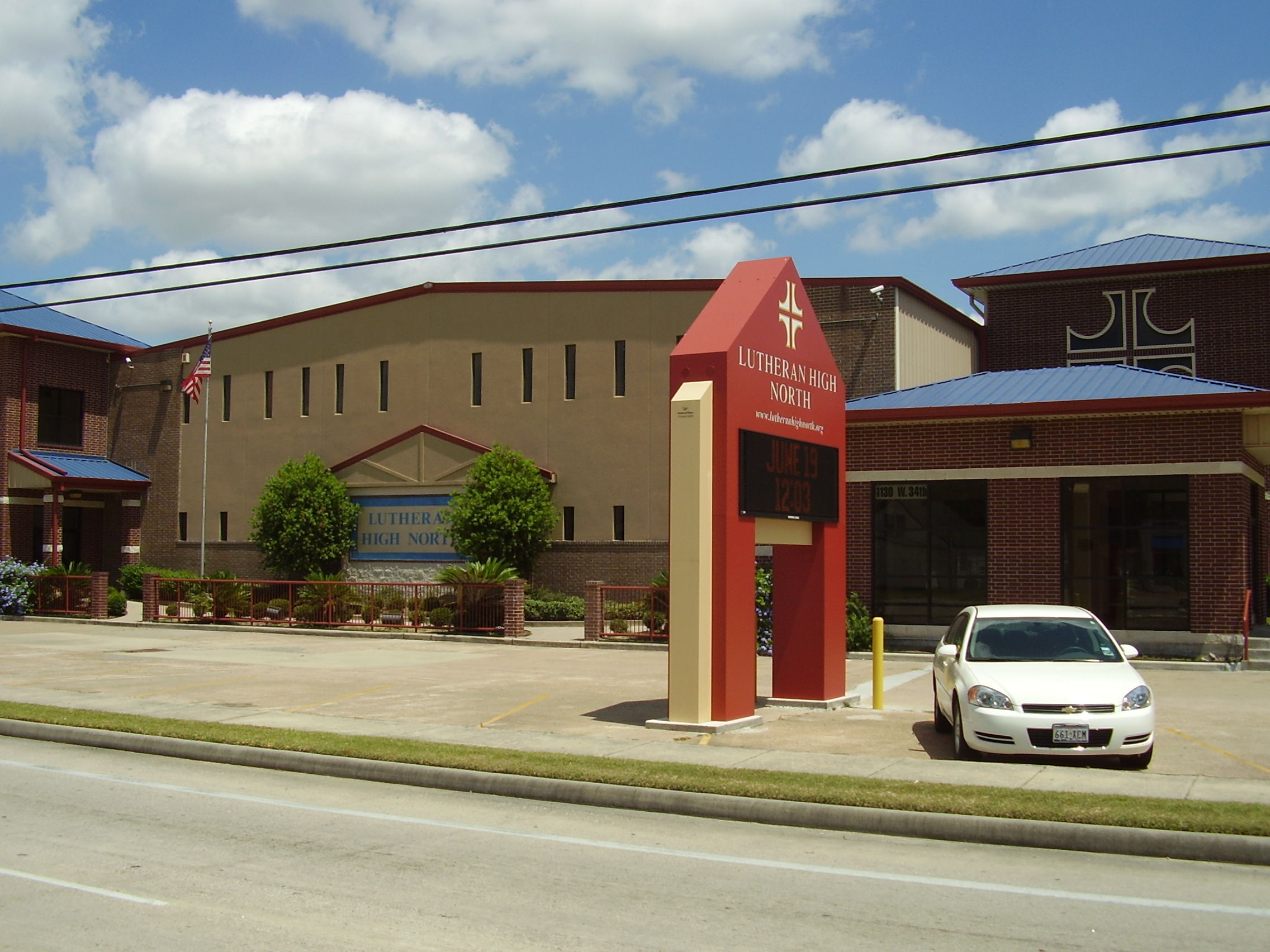

Location
- 1130 West 34th Street; Houston, Texas 77018; United States
- Coordinates: 29.817885°N 95.419795°W

Information
- Former name: Lutheran High School North
- Type: Private Christian
- Religious affiliation: Lutheran Church–Missouri Synod
- Established: 1982
- Closed: 2024
- Principal: Matt Korte
- Color
- Team name: Lions
- Website: www.lutherannorth.org

Lutheran North Academy was a private Christian high school in Houston, Texas, in the Garden Oaks area. The school was affiliated with the Lutheran Church–Missouri Synod and was a member of the Texas Association of Private and Parochial Schools. It was operated by the Lutheran Education Association of Houston (LEAH) along with three other schools.

== History ==
Lutheran High School opened at 6901 Woodridge in Houston in 1949. In the 1950s, as the Houston area continued to grow, land for a future second high school was purchased at 1130 W. 34th Street on the north side of the city. Ground was broken for Lutheran High School North on December 2, 1972, and freshmen and sophomores began classes on October 1, 1980. In 1983, the Lutheran High School campus was replaced by two campuses, one of which was Lutheran North The other campus, Lutheran High School South, which later became Lutheran South Academy, was opened at 7703 South Loop East, near the intersection of the 610 Loop and Interstate 45; that is now the site of the Harris County Department of Education.

The first homecoming football game at Lutheran North was played in October 1982, and the first graduation ceremony occurred in spring 1983. In 2022, middle school classes (grades 6–8) were added and the school's name was changed to Lutheran Academy North.

In April 2024 the school announced that it would cease operations. Heritage Classical Academy, a charter school, moved into the former Lutheran North campus in fall 2025.

== See also ==
- Christianity in Houston
