= Lutheran High School of Kansas City =

The Lutheran High School of Kansas City

Location
- 12411 Wornall Road; Kansas City, Missouri 64145; United States
- 38°54′11″N 94°35′31″W

Information
- Type: Private
- Motto: Preparing Lives for Today, Tomorrow, & Eternity.
- Established: 1980
- Principal: Adam Kirsch
- Grades: 9–12
- Enrollment: 140 (2022)
- Colors: Maroon and gold
- Team name: Knights / Lady Knights
- Accreditation: Cognia
- Affiliation: Lutheran Church–Missouri Synod
- Website: www.lhskc.com

Lutheran High School of Kansas City is a parochial Lutheran secondary school in Kansas City, Missouri, that serves 140 students in grades nine through twelve. It is associated with the Lutheran Church – Missouri Synod. As of 2025, the executive director is Adam Kirsch.

== Overview ==
The Lutheran High School of Kansas City was founded in 1980 with 44 students and 9 faculty members, and it graduated its first class in 1983. Over the course of its history, it has had over 800 graduates. The school is accredited by Cognia, Missouri Non-Public Accreditation, and the National Lutheran School Accreditation. Ninety-five percent of the student body are involved in at least one extra-curricular activity. The school currently offers four AP courses. Students have an average ACT score of 25, and 95 percent of graduates move on to attend college. Various Lutheran elementary schools in the area feed into the high school, including Martin Luther Academy, Calvary Lutheran, Bethany Lutheran, Timothy Lutheran, Hope Lutheran, and Christ Lutheran.

== Campus ==
Lutheran High School is located on a 29-acre (12 ha) in South Kansas City. The 143,000-square-foot (13,300 m^{2}) educational building includes a full gym, theater, cafeteria, library, science lab, and computer lab. The campus also has its own soccer fields.

The school was originally located on leased property near Interstate 435 and Holmes Road in Kansas City, Missouri. Due to the sale of the property, the school purchased the former Benjamin Harrison School from the Kansas City, Missouri, public school system and relocated in spring 1985, where the school would remain for 20 years. In summer 2005, Lutheran High School moved to its current location at 12411 Wornall Road. The current campus is the former home of the Loretto Academy, which occupied the site from 1964 to 1984.

== Athletics ==
Lutheran High School completes in a variety of sports through the Missouri State High School Activities Association. The school's athletic director is DJ Dan Bickel. Most sports compete at the Class 1 level, with the notable exception of Scholar Bowl which competes in Class 4 and was district champion from 2021 to 2025. The school has had one student each compete at the national level in the sports of Scholar Bowl and Track and Field.

=== Boys sports ===
- Cross Country
- Track and Field
- Basketball
- Baseball
- Soccer
- Tennis
- Golf

=== Girls sports ===
- Cross Country
- Track and Field
- Basketball
- Soccer
- Tennis
- Volleyball
- Golf

=== Combined sports ===
- Scholar Bowl
