= West Lutheran High School =

Location
- 3350 Harbor Lane North; Plymouth, Minnesota; United States; 45°01′04″N 93°27′46″W

Information
- Type: Private secondary
- Religious affiliation: Lutheranism
- Denomination: Wisconsin Evangelical Lutheran Synod; Evangelical Lutheran Synod
- Established: 1979; 47 years ago
- Principal: Dave Gartner
- Grades: 9–12
- Colors: Green and white
- Mascot: Warrior
- Accreditation: MNSAA
- Website: www.wlhs.net

West Lutheran High School is a private Lutheran co-educational secondary school located in Plymouth, a suburb of the Twin Cities, in Minnesota, in the United States. It is operated by 20 Lutheran congregations belonging to the Wisconsin Evangelical Lutheran Synod and the Evangelical Lutheran Synod. It is accredited by the Minnesota Nonpublic School Accrediting Association (MNSAA).

The school was opened in 1979 in temporary quarters. A permanent facility was established in 1996. It serves grades 9–12 and has a student body of about 202.
