= Hope Lutheran High School =

Private Lutheran high school in Minnesota

Coordinates: 44°2′53″N 91°37′48″W

Hope Lutheran High School is a private Lutheran high school located in Winona, Minnesota. It was started by a small board in the summer of 2003. The school's mascot is the patriot. The school opened its doors for the fall of 2003–2004 with a class of seven. Now, the school will graduate its first senior class in 2007. The school has grown to over 40 students and plans to expand into a larger building in the near future.
