= Lutheran High School West =

High school in Cleveland, Ohio, US, metro area

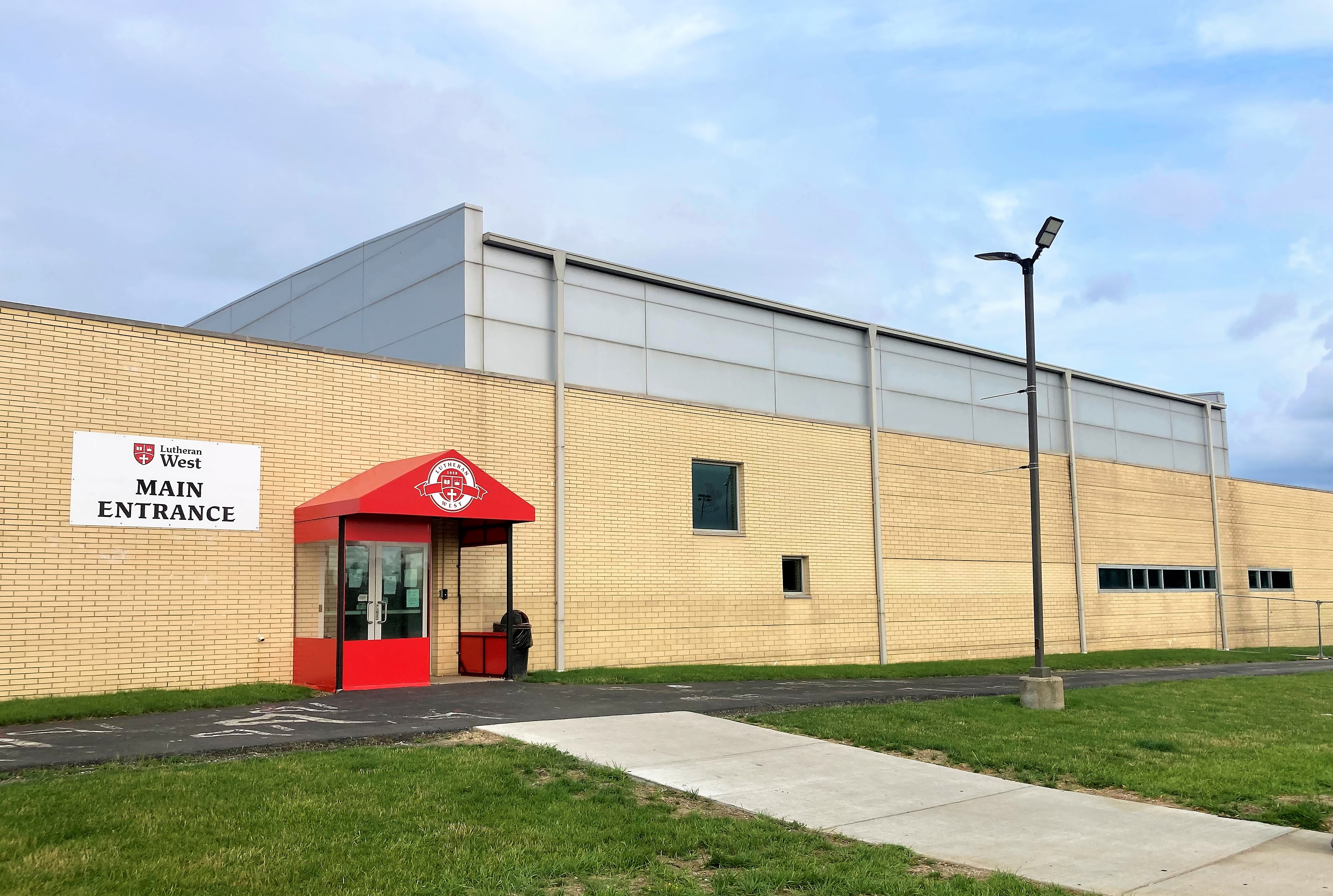

Location
- 3850 Linden Road; Rocky River, Ohio 44116; United States; 41°27′28″N 81°50′52″W

Information
- Type: Private secondary school
- Religious affiliation: Lutheran Church – Missouri Synod
- Established: 1958; 68 years ago
- Principal: Mike Waugh
- Teaching staff: 32.9 (on an FTE basis)
- Grades: 6–12
- Enrollment: 740 (2025-2026)
- Student to teacher ratio: 11.7
- Campus type: Large suburban
- Colors: Red and white
- Slogan: Inspiring scholarship, faith and community
- Athletics conference: Chagrin Valley Conference
- Nickname: Longhorns
- Accreditation: AdvancED
- Tuition: $11,100 (2019-20)
- Website: www.lutheranwest.com

Lutheran High School West, also known as Lutheran West, is a private college-prep co-ed high school and middle school (grades 6-12) in Rocky River, Ohio, United States. Established in 1958, it is affiliated with the Lutheran Church – Missouri Synod and serves Cleveland and Northeast Ohio.

== History ==
In 1946, sixteen Lutheran congregations formally met to establish an association and resolved to establish a Lutheran high school in Cleveland, Ohio. The result was the founding of the Cleveland Lutheran High School Association (CLHSA). In 1948, Lutheran West's precursor, Lutheran High School, was built in the east side of Cleveland. In 1958, that school's property was acquired by the state of Ohio for construction of Interstate 90, and the CLHSA decided to build two high schools to replace it: Lutheran High School West and Lutheran High School East, located in Cleveland Heights.

In 2022, Lutheran West expanded its grade level offerings to middle school, adding grades 6 through 8.

== Demographics ==
The demographic breakdown of the 680 students enrolled for 2024-2025 was:

- Native American/Alaskan - 0
- Asian - 15
- Black - 100
- Hispanic - 100
- White - 450
- Multiracial - N/A

== Notable alumni ==
- Nickie Antonio, politician
- Tim Gettinger, professional hockey player in the National Hockey League (NHL)
