= St. Paul Lutheran High School =

Private high school in Concordia, Missouri

Location
- 205 S. Main Street; Concordia, Missouri; United States; 38°59′16″N 93°33′55″W

Information
- Former name: St. Paul's College
- School type: Private residential
- Religious affiliation: Lutheran Church–Missouri Synod
- Established: 1883
- Executive director: Rev. Paul Mehl
- Principal: Meredith Marsh
- Faculty: 17
- Grades: 9–12
- Enrollment: 200
- Campus size: 40 acres (16 ha)
- Campus type: small city
- Nickname: Saints
- Accreditation: National Lutheran School Accreditation; Cognia
- Website: splhs.org

St. Paul Lutheran High School (SPHS) is a secondary school in Concordia, Missouri, United States. It is affiliated with the Lutheran Church–Missouri Synod (LCMS). The school opened in 1883 and, from 1905 to 1986, included two years of junior college and was known as St. Paul's College.

About 200 students attend SPHS, with half of them living in dormitories on the 40-acre (16 ha) campus. It is the only remaining residential high school run by the LCMS itself.

SPHS is accredited by the National Lutheran School Association and Cognia.

== History ==
In 1883, Franz Julius Biltz, who was the pastor of St. Paul's Lutheran Church in Concordia and president of the Western District of the LCMS, petitioned the synod to establish a pre-seminary preparatory school to help meet the demand for pastors. At the time, the LCMS was not able to undertake the project financially because it was building Concordia Seminary in St. Louis. Biltz then urged his congregation in Concordia to open and support the school. Classes for St. Paul's College first met in a private home on January 3, 1884, with Andrew Baepler, the English-language missionary for the Western District, as the instructor.

The first permanent building opened later in 1884. Additions to the two-story brick structure were constructed as enrollment grew. It was known as the Administration Building in its early years, but later was called Founders Hall. It burned down in 1964.

As with the other preparatory schools in the LCMS, the German gymnasium model was used. Initially, only the first four years of the six-year gymnasium curriculum were offered at St. Paul's, equivalent to a high school. In 1905, the fifth year and, in 1906, the sixth (the first two years of college) were added. Graduates of the college would typically enter Concordia Seminary.

In 1896, the congregation gave the school to the LCMS.

The school was temporarily closed in 1919 due to an outbreak of typhoid that claimed the lives of three students. It later also temporarily closed during an influenza epidemic. Instruction was originally in German, but switched to English as a result, in part, of anti-German sentiment during World War I.

In 1924, the school's first gymnasium was built. A new dormitory named Biltz Hall was added sometime thereafter; it now houses the St. Paul Institute for Education. In 1949, a new administration building, Baepler Hall, was constructed and is the central building of the campus quad.

By the early 1960s, the school had eight buildings on a 20-acre (8.1 ha) campus. While it still offered pre-seminary training for young men entering the pastoral ministry, it began to broaden its offerings, Courses for men and women wanting to become Christian day school teachers were added in 1954, with eleven women being in the first class. The school also enrolled students who did not intend to enter church vocations. Girls were first admitted to the high school in 1968. The college received accreditation by the North Central Association in 1965.

Starting in the 1930s, the development of the American model of education (four years of high school followed by two or four years of college) resulted in the LCMS moving away from the German model, with the pre-seminary schools being separated into high schools and junior colleges. By 1980, the LCMS was finding it difficult to continue supporting the number of junior colleges it had. The 1983 convention of the LCMS adopted a resolution to discontinue the subsidy given to both St. Paul's College and to St. John's College in Winfield, Kansas, effective June 30, 1986. This resulted in both colleges closing in 1986. However, the high school department of St. Paul's, which was known as St. Paul's College High, remains in operation as St. Paul Lutheran High School. SPHS is the last residential high school still operated by the LCMS.

The Lafayette County Historical Society erected a historical marker in 1983 as the school approached its 100th anniversary.

== Campus ==
SPHS sits on a 40-acre (16 ha) campus. The nine buildings include the administration building (Baepler Hall), gymnasium, dining hall, classrooms, and separate dorms for boys and girls. Sports fields, including a running track, lie to the west.

== Student body ==
Approximately 200 students attend SPHS. In 2018, 35% of the students were international students, many of them being children of LCMS foreign missionaries. As of 2023, about 48% of the students are local and live at home, while 52% live in the dormitories.

== Athletics ==
The athletic teams are known as the Saints and the school colors are royal blue and white. SPHS is a member of the Missouri State High School Activities Association. Boys teams include baseball, basketball, cross country, 8-man football, golf, soccer, and track and field. Girls teams include basketball, cross country, soccer, track and field, and volleyball.

In the 1920's, baseball was the primary sport, with games played against area town, American Legion, high school, and college teams. Basketball games were also played against the same types of opponents even before the gymnasium was erected in 1924. A football team was also formed, but at first the faculty did not allow games to be played against outside teams.
