= Orlando Lutheran Academy =

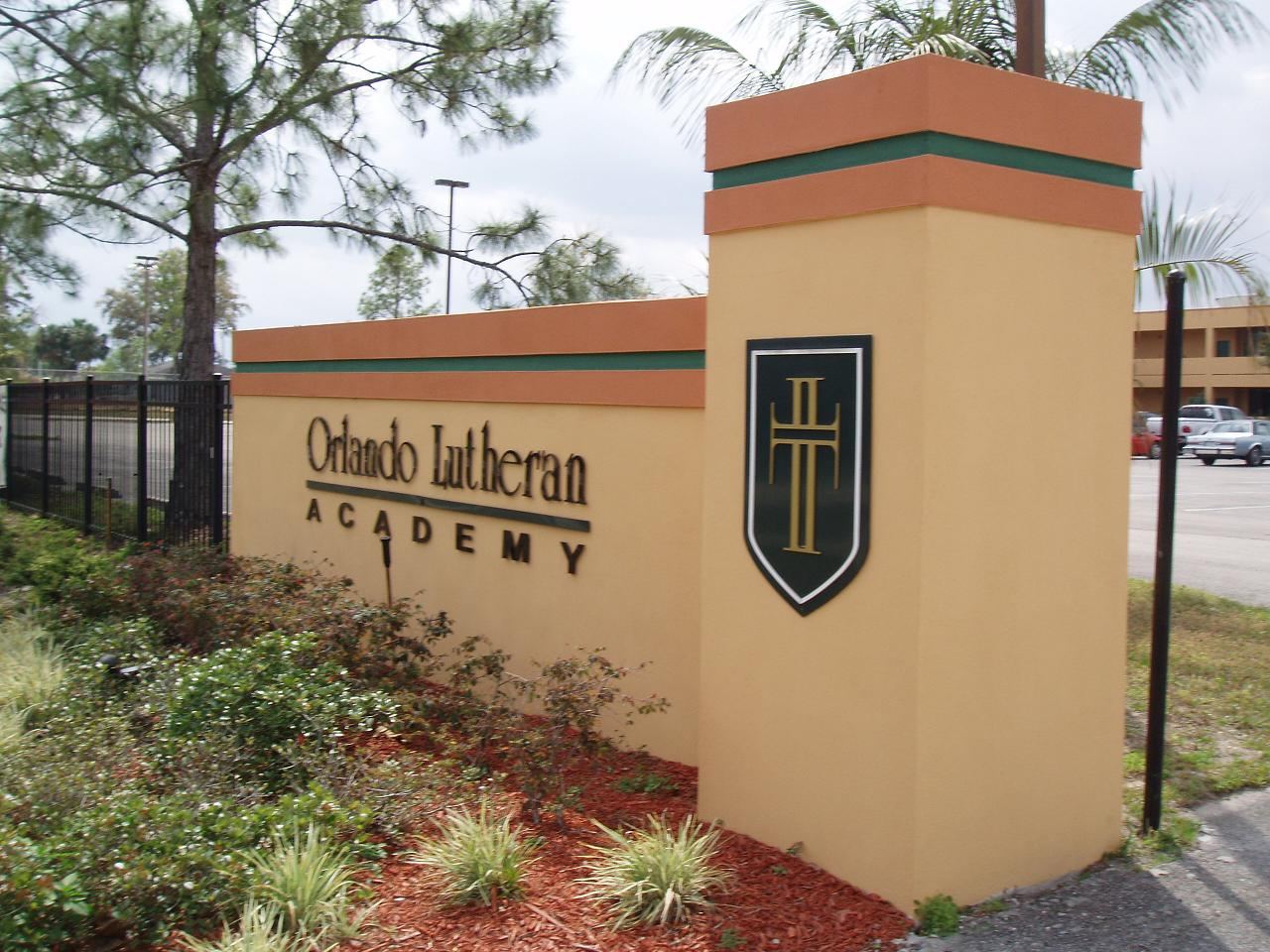
a photo of The Orlando Lutheran Academy

The Orlando Lutheran Academy was a private, religious school located in Orlando, FL. It served as both a middle and high school, and functioned in a way that was similar to a standard, public, high school. At its high point, it was ranked in the top 3 private schools in Orlando, but is now defunct as a result of financial difficulties incurred during the height of its enrollment. On Sunday, May 23, 2010, the school had their farewell party as a dedication to the school and its alumni.

== Classes available ==
- English (I/II/III/IV/AP),
- Mathematics (Integrated Math/Algebra I/Geometry/Algebra II/Pre-Calculus/Consumer Math [dealing with check writing, calculating loans, etc.] and AP Calculus)
- Science (Integrated Science, Anatomy & Physiology, Chemistry, Biology, and Physics)
- Social Studies (World History/American History/American Government/Economics)
- Physical Education (Team Sports/Weight Lifting/Life Management)
- Christian Theology (Old Testament, New Testament, The Synoptic Gospels, and Creation Week/Judgement Day)
- Art (Clay I/II; Art 2D/3D)
- Practical Arts (Choir, Band), and Foreign Language (Spanish I/II/III)

Students chose from electives such as: Civil War, Psychology, Christian Apologetics, and Yearbook.

== Student opportunity ==
Students could participate in a number of extracurricular activities, including: basketball, track/field, soccer, football, baseball, golf, student choir, contemporary praise band, weightlifting, drama, and chapel production. Also, dual-enrollment was offered at Valencia Community College which allowed for students to take part in college classes while earning both a high school graduation credit, and a college credit.

== Accreditation ==
Orlando Lutheran Academy was a fully accredited school as recognized by the Southern Association of Colleges and Schools (SACS), the Commission on International and Trans-Regional Accreditation (CITA), the Association of Independent Schools of Florida (AISF), and the National Lutheran School Accreditation organization (NLSA).

== School paper ==
The Crusader Communicator was the official weekly school-to-home newsletter of The Orlando Lutheran Academy which was produced by Carl Schuster.
