= Lutheran High School of San Antonio =

Location
- 18104 Babcock Road; San Antonio, (Bexar County), Texas 78255; United States
- Coordinates: 29°36′40″N 98°37′39″W

Information
- Type: Private high school
- Religious affiliation: Lutheran Church–Missouri Synod
- Established: 1995; 31 years ago
- Dean: Jeff Sanders
- Principal: Andrew Eickstead
- Grades: 9–12
- Age range: 14-19
  - Grade 9: 25
  - Grade 10: 25
  - Grade 11: 25
  - Grade 12: 25
- Average class size: 15
- Campus size: 54 acres (22 ha)
- Colors: Garnet and grey
- Athletics: Yes
- Athletics conference: TAPPS 4A
- Sports: Football, soccer, cheerleading, basketball, swimming, cross country, track and field, baseball, softball, golf, and tennis. eSports: Rocket League, Super Smash Bros. Ultimate, Valorant, and Splatoon 3
- Mascot: Mustang
- Team name: Mustangs
- Accreditation: National Lutheran Schools Accreditation
- Newspaper: Hoofbeats
- Website: www.lhssa.org

Lutheran High School of San Antonio (LHSSA) is a private, college preparatory Lutheran high school located in San Antonio, Texas, in the United States. As the city's only Lutheran high school, LHSSA is supported by six congregations of the Lutheran Church–Missouri Synod (LCMS) comprising the Lutheran High School Association.

== History ==
Lutheran High School of San Antonio, first conceptualized in 1993 by Lutheran church leaders, was established in 1995 by area Lutheran congregations. The city's only Lutheran high school, LHSSA is supported by six LCMS congregations forming the Lutheran High School Association. An accredited college preparatory Christian high school in the Lutheran education tradition, LHSSA nurtures faith and discipleship and promotes academic excellence to cultivate Christian servant leaders.

The high school was originally located on the former Concordia Lutheran Church campus on Basse Road. In 1998, when Concordia relocated, the church sold the property to Lutheran High School and the school remained there until 2004.

In 2001, the school board developed a five-year strategic plan that included a move to a new permanent location by 2006. Beginning in 2004, the school's leadership team worked with B&A architects to develop a master plan for new facilities that included classrooms, athletic facilities, a library, auditorium and dining hall. In the same year, the high school moved to the Methodist Mission Home on Whitby Road and operated out of temporary modular structures for two school years.

In 2005, the high school launched the “Upon this Rock” capital campaign and raised nearly $1 million, which allowed the high school to acquire the current 54-acre (22 ha) property at 18104 Babcock Road on the city's northwest side.

In 2008, LHSSA announced the receipt of a $3 million gift from The Greehey Family Foundation to fund new construction of Phase I of the school's campus. The donation, the largest single gift ever received by LHSSA, was used to construct the campus’ first new permanent structure which includes classrooms, dining area, gymnasium, and athletic amenities.

In 2017, LHSSA received a substantial donation for athletic facilities. A dual-use football/soccer field and baseball field were completed in spring 2018, allowing the Mustangs to play true home games for the first time since moving to the current campus.

The 2020–2021 academic year gave rise to eSports teams at LHSSA. Teams competed in both Rocket League and League of Legends in the PlayVS and NASEF organizations. The number of game titles expanded during the 2021–2022 academic year to include: Splatoon 2, Super Smash Bros. Ultimate, and Madden NFL 21. LHSSA became a founding supporter of local eSports league R20 Premiere which added Valorant to the list of titles. LHSSA has competed in educational robotics since the fall of 2012 with its first entry into San Antonio hub for BEST Robotics. The school currently competes in the following robotics programs:

- FIRST Tech Challenge - 6407 Mechanical Mustangs Secretariat, 7615 Mechanical Mustangs Affirmed, 22857 Mechanical Mustangs Citation, and 23916 Mechanical Mustangs Sir Barton
- MATE-ROV "Underwater Robotics" - Mechanical Mustangs Whirl-a-Way

Lutheran High School has a partnerships to support a team in the FIRST Access program with Kinetic Kids. FIRST in Texas aims to make FIRST robotics programming more accessible to students with disabilities.

- FIRST Access - 21321 Mechanical Mustangs Justify

As part of the Fall 2021 Big Give San Antonio campaign, LHSSA received support and donations to begin construction of the girls softball field adjacent to the other sports fields on the property. With initial construction completed in the spring of 2022, this field afforded the softball team a better practice facility and a place to play home games along with the other outdoor team sports on the LHSSA sports complex.
