= Victory Christian Academy =

Private christian school in Chula Vista, California, United States

Location
- Buena Vista Way; Chula Vista, California; United States
- Coordinates: 32°38′29.8″N 117°00′24.7″W

Information
- Type: Private Christian
- Religious affiliation: Lutheranism
- Opened: 1975
- Enrollment: 95
- Campus type: Trailers/bungalows/Gymnasium/Athletic Field
- Colors: Purple, Black; Secondary colors- Gray and White
- Team name: Knights
- Affiliation: Lutheran Church–Missouri Synod
- Website: victorysouthbay.org/school/

Victory Christian Academy is a private, Christian elementary and high school in Chula Vista, California. It is affiliated with the Lutheran Church–Missouri Synod. The school serves approximately 180 students in total (K-12).

Lutheran High School opened at Faith Lutheran Church as Cal Lutheran High School in 1975 with its first graduating class in 1978. In 1984, its name was changed to Lutheran High School of San Diego and it moved to a new campus in the Lake Murray area of San Diego. The campus was located on the old Cleveland Elementary public school on Lake Atlin. The school stayed there until spring 1988. In fall 1988, it moved back to Faith Lutheran Church. In fall 1999, the school moved to Holy Spirit Catholic Church located on 55th street in San Diego. In fall 2009, it was granted a permanent home located at the Church of Joy Lutheran Church in Chula Vista on Buena Vista Way. In 2015 the high school and the Church of Joy merged with Pilgrim Lutheran Church and its elementary school to form Victory Christian Church and Academy.

== Notable alumni ==
- James Burkee, politician and academic
