= Trinity Lutheran School (Orlando, Florida) =

Trinity Lutheran School Child Development Center

Location
- 123 E Livingston St. Orlando, Florida 32801; United States
- Coordinates: 28.547556°N 81.375764°W

Information
- Type: Private elementary school
- Religious affiliation: Lutheranism
- Denomination: Lutheran Church–Missouri Synod
- Established: 1953; 73 years ago
- Headmaster: Senior Paster Doug Kallesen
- Website: www.trinitydowntown.org

Trinity Lutheran School is a Lutheran Child Development Center in Orlando, Florida, in the United States. Founded in 1953, the school provides childcare services from infancy through PreK-4, and is a ministry of Trinity Downtown. It is a fully accredited school recognized by the National Lutheran School Accreditation of the Lutheran Church–Missouri Synod.

Trinity's Child Development Center serves children 6 weeks old through VPK-4.

== History ==
The school opened in 1953 with solely a kindergarten and the first grade. By 1960 the school had expanded to sixth grade. It expanded to eighth grade in the early 1970s. The Child Development Center opened in 1983. Due to declining enrollment in the elementary school program, grades K–8 were discontinued after the 2018–19 school year.

Trinity Lutheran School now has around 250 children enrolled.
