= Salt Lake Lutheran High School =

School in Utah, United States

Coordinates: 40°31′15″N 111°56′42″W

Salt Lake Lutheran High School was a Lutheran school founded in 1984 and located until 2011 in Salt Lake City, Utah, United States. In 2011 the school moved to Riverton, Utah, and took the name Concordia Preparatory School. It closed in 2013.

== Education ==
The school taught students in grades 7–12. It was accredited by the Northwest Accreditation Commission. In addition to undertaking a full high school curriculum, students were required to attend chapel weekly.

== History ==
Owned by a coalition of Lutheran churches in the Salt Lake City area, the school was founded in 1984. Originally housed in St. John's Lutheran Church in Salt Lake City's Liberty Park neighborhood, the school acquired its own site on South 900 East in 1993. For the floor of its new gymnasium, the school acquired the former basketball court of the old Salt Palace arena, which was being demolished and replaced.

In 2011 the school moved to a 56,000 square foot, 10 acre facility in Riverton and changed its name to Concordia Preparatory School. The school closed on June 30, 2013.

== Sports ==
Sports teams were known as 'Lynx'.
