= Lutheran High School (Springfield, Illinois) =

American school

- Springfield, Illinois 62703

Information
- Type: Private high school
- Religious affiliation: Christianity
- Denomination: Lutheran Church – Missouri Synod
- Established: December 31, 1978
- School district: LCMS Central Illinois District (Lies within Pleasant Plains Community School District)
- Principal: Zack Klug
- Faculty: 14.4 (on FTE basis)
- Grades: 9 - 12
- Enrollment: 160 (as of 2016-17)
  - Grade 9: 58
  - Grade 10: 47
  - Grade 11: 47
  - Grade 12: 45
- Student to teacher ratio: 13.7
- Website: www.springfieldlutheran.com

Lutheran High School in Springfield, Illinois, is a private Lutheran high school that was founded in 1978. The school is accredited by the Illinois State Board of Education and the National Lutheran School Accreditation. As of the 2005-06 school year, the school had an enrollment of 197 students and 70.8 classroom teachers (on a FTE ) basis, for a student-teacher ratio of 18.3.
