= Martin Luther School =

Location
- 60-02 Maspeth Avenue; Maspeth, New York 11378; United States; 40.7229°N 73.9059°W

Information
- Former name: Martin Luther High School
- Type: Private middle and high school
- Religious affiliation: Lutheranism
- Denomination: Lutheran Church–Missouri Synod
- Established: 1960; 66 years ago
- Executive Director: James Regan
- Principal: Donna Younghese
- Faculty: 28 (2021)
- Years offered: 6–12
- Gender: Co-educational
- Enrollment: 193 (2021)
- Colors: Red and white
- Mascot: Black Cougar
- Newspaper: The Cougar Chronicle
- Yearbook: Invictus
- Tuition: $9,635 HS / $5,435 MS (2021)
- Website: www.martinluthernyc.org

Martin Luther School is a co-educational private Lutheran middle and high school in the Maspeth neighborhood of the borough of Queens, New York City, in the State of New York, United States. Founded in 1960 as Martin Luther High School, the name of the school was changed to Martin Luther School in 2012 when a middle school was added.

== Students ==
Martin Luther School serves students from Queens and Brooklyn from a variety of ethnic, religious, and academic backgrounds.

== Academics ==
Students are required to take classes in business, English, history, fine arts, foreign languages, mathematics, physical education, science, and theology. Martin Luther also offers Advanced Placement courses.

Martin Luther School is accredited by the Middle States Association Commissions on Elementary and Secondary Schools.
