= Evergreen Lutheran High School =

Wisconsin Synod Lutheran high school in Tacoma, Washington

Location
- 7306 Waller Road East; Tacoma, Washington 98443; United States; 47°11′27″N 122°23′32″W

Information
- Type: Private secondary school
- Religious affiliation: Lutheranism
- Denomination: Wisconsin Evangelical Lutheran Synod; Evangelical Lutheran Synod
- Established: 1978; 48 years ago
- Principal: Evan Kolander
- Faculty: 16
- Grades: 9–12
- Enrollment: 119 students (for 2025-2026)
- Colors: Green, white, and blue
- Athletics: Washington Interscholastic Activities Association Sea-King District 2
- Team name: Eagles
- Yearbook: Vox Aquilae
- Website: www.elhs.org

Evergreen Lutheran High School (commonly shortened to "Evergreen") is an American private secondary school in Tacoma, Washington, that is owned and operated by the Pacific Northwest Lutheran High School Association. It is affiliated with the Wisconsin Evangelical Lutheran Synod (WELS) and Evangelical Lutheran Synod (ELS). The school is supported by the Evergreen Lutheran School System, which comprises WELS and ELS churches and primary schools in the Puget Sound and Pacific Northwest area.

The school's sports teams are referred to as the Evergreen Eagles. The school is attended by teen members of area WELS churches, as well as international students from South Korea, China, Hong Kong, India, and Japan.

== Athletics ==
The Evergreen Eagles participate in the Washington Interscholastic Activities Association (WIAA) Sea-King District 2, Sea-Tac 1B league. The school has won the WIAA Scholastic Cup for exceptional athletic and academic achievement twice. In the fall, the school offers girls and boys soccer teams, a boys football team (first offered in 2007 and currently inactive due to low interest and concern for safety with low numbers), and a girls volleyball team. In the winter, it has boys and girls basketball, and cheerleading. In the spring, it has boys baseball and a track and field team.

Evergreen Lutheran offers one AP course, AP United States History, to prepares students for the Advanced Placement Program tests.

== Extracurricular activities ==
Evergreen students have many opportunities for extracurricular activities. These include choir, band, drama, knowledge bowl, and student council.

== Campus facilities ==
Evergreen Lutheran was started in 1978 at its first campus in DuPont, Washington, before the lease expired the summer of 1991. Evergreen then rented facilities from Holy Trinity Lutheran Church in Des Moines, Washington, from September 1991 until July 2013, during which time classes were held in portable classrooms, outbuildings, gymnasium, and rented classrooms.

On December 18, 2012, after more than 25 years of unsuccessful attempts to locate and purchase a permanent facility, Evergreen purchased a 30-acre (12 ha) campus with a 54,000-square-foot (5,000 m^{2}) school building that had been built in 2005 for Mount Rainier Lutheran High School. The campus is located at the corner of Waller Rd and 72nd Street East in Tacoma. The campus was purchased from the Lutheran Church Extension Fund of the Lutheran Church – MIssouri Synod. Evergreen moved into the new campus building on July 20, 2013, and on September 9, 2013, Evergreen held the first day of classes of its 36th school year at the new facility.
