= List of Baptist schools in the United States =

This is a list of Baptist schools in the United States.

== Theological Seminaries ==
- Andover Newton Seminary at Yale Divinity School, New Haven, Connecticut
- Baptist Missionary Association Theological Seminary, Jacksonville, Texas
- Baptist Seminary of Kentucky, Lexington, Kentucky
- Berkeley School of Theology, Berkeley, California
- B. H. Carroll Theological Institute, Irving, Texas
- Central Baptist Theological Seminary of Minneapolis, Plymouth, Minnesota
- Central Seminary, Overland Park, Kansas
- Colgate Rochester Crozer Divinity School, Rochester, New York
- Covenant Baptist Theological Seminary, Owensboro, Kentucky
- Detroit Baptist Theological Seminary, Allen Park, Michigan
- Gateway Seminary, Ontario, California
- John Leland Center for Theological Studies, Arlington County, Virginia
- Mid-America Baptist Theological Seminary, Arlington, Tennessee
- Midwestern Baptist Theological Seminary, Kansas City, Missouri
- New Orleans Baptist Theological Seminary, New Orleans, Louisiana
- Northern Seminary, Lisle, Illinois
- Palmer Theological Seminary, St. Davids, Pennsylvania
- Southeastern Baptist Theological Seminary, Wake Forest, North Carolina
- Southern Baptist Theological Seminary, Louisville, Kentucky
- Southwestern Baptist Theological Seminary, Fort Worth, Texas
- Temple Baptist Seminary, Winston-Salem, North Carolina
- George W. Truett Theological Seminary, Waco, Texas

== Colleges/Universities ==
See List of Baptist colleges and universities in the United States.

== K-12 Schools ==
=== Mid-Atlantic ===
- Calvary Baptist School (Pennsylvania), Lansdale, Pennsylvania
- Denbigh Baptist Christian School, Newport News, Virginia
- Liberty Christian Academy, Lynchburg
- Oak Hill Academy, Mouth of Wilson, Virginia
- Riverdale Baptist School, Upper Marlboro, Maryland
- Ross Corners Christian Academy, Vestal, New York
- Southside Baptist Christian School, Richmond, Virginia

=== Midwest ===
- Calvary Baptist School (Wisconsin), Menomonee Falls, Wisconsin
- Community Baptist Christian School, Shields, Michigan
- Faith Baptist School, Davison, Michigan
- First Baptist Christian School (Illinois), Danville, Illinois
- First Baptist Christian School (Ohio), Elyria, Ohio
- Heritage Christian School (Ohio), Findlay, Ohio
- Inter-City Baptist School, Allen Park, Michigan
- Monclova Christian Academy, Monclova, Ohio
- Southfield Christian School, Southfield, Michigan
- Sugar Creek Christian Academy, Ironton, Ohio
- Temple Christian School, Dayton, Ohio

=== South ===
- Baptist Preparatory School, Little Rock, Arkansas
- Bay Area Christian School, League City, Texas
- Community Christian School, Bradenton, Florida
- Curtis Baptist School, Augusta, Georgia
- Dade Christian School, Miami, Florida
- Eagle's Landing Christian Academy, McDonough, Georgia
- First Baptist Academy of Dallas, Dallas, Texas
- Florence Christian School, Florence, South Carolina
- Franklin Road Christian School, Murfreesboro, Tennessee
- Friendship Christian School, Raleigh, North Carolina
- Hebron Christian Academy, Dacula, Georgia
- Heritage Christian School (Florida), Kissimmee, Florida
- High Point Christian Academy, High Point, North Carolina
- Hyde Park Schools, Austin, Texas
- Liberty Christian Preparatory School, Tavares, Florida
- Metrolina Christian Academy, Indian Trail, North Carolina
- Millers Creek Christian School, Millers Creek, North Carolina
- Orlando Christian Prep, Orlando, Florida
- Ovilla Christian School, Ovilla, Texas
- Parkview Baptist High School, Baton Rouge, Louisiana
- Prestonwood Christian Academy, Plano, Texas
- Raleigh Christian Academy, Raleigh, North Carolina
- San Marcos Baptist Academy, San Marcos, Texas
- Second Baptist School, Houston, Texas
- Sherwood Christian Academy, Albany, Georgia
- Shiloh Christian School, Springdale, Arkansas
- Tattnall Square Academy, Macon, Georgia
- Temple Baptist Academy, Powell, Tennessee
- Trinity Christian School, Texarkana, Arkansas
- University Christian School, Jacksonville, Florida

=== West ===
- Hawaii Baptist Academy, Honolulu, Hawaii
- Twin Falls Christian Academy, Twin Falls, Idaho

== Secondary Schools ==
- Fork Union Military Academy, Fork Union, Virginia

== Elementary Schools ==
- Bethel Christian School, Lancaster, California

== Defunct Schools ==
- Agape Baptist Academy, Stockton, Missouri - closed 2023
- Americus Institute, Americus, Georgia - closed 1932
- Anniston Normal and Industrial School, Anniston, Alabama - closed around 1915
- Baptist Park School, Taylor, Michigan - closed 2016
- Calvary Baptist Theological Seminary, Lansdale, Pennsylvania - closed 2013
- Caskey School of Divinity, Pineville, Louisiana - closed 2015
- Charlestown Female Seminary, Charlestown, Massachusetts
- Cobb Divinity School, Lewiston, Maine - closed 1908
- Grace Baptist School, Portland, Maine - closed 2013
- Grandview Park Baptist School, Des Moines, Iowa - closed 2014
- Hiawassee High School, Hiawassee, Georgia
- Hilltop Baptist School, Colorado Springs, Colorado - closed 2011
- Howe Institute, New Iberia, Louisiana - closed 1933
- Keysville Mission Industrial Academy, Keysville, Virginia - closed 1957
- Los Angeles Baptist High School, North Hills, California - closed 2012
- Macon Road Baptist School, Memphis, Tennessee - closed 2023
- Mo-Ark Baptist Academy, Blue Eye, Arkansas - closed 1931
- Montrose Christian School, North Bethesda, Maryland - closed 2013
- Mountain Empire Baptist School, Bristol, Tennessee - closed 2010
- Nansemond Collegiate Institute, Suffolk, Virginia - closed 1939
- North Houston Baptist School, Houston, Texas - closed 2011
- Northern Neck Industrial Academy, Ivondale, Virginia - closed 1938
- Parsonsfield Seminary, Parsonsfield, Maine - closed 1949
- Rappahannock Industrial Academy, Dunnsville, Virginia - closed 1948
- Richmond Theological Institute, Richmond, Virginia - closed 1899
- South Side Baptist School, Oak Lawn, Illinois - closed 2019
- Victory Christian School, Williamstown, New Jersey - closed 2012

== See also ==
- Lists of schools in the United States
- List of independent Catholic schools in the United States
- List of international schools in the United States
- List of Baptist colleges and universities in the United States
