= Roger Donnahoo =

American football player (1937–2020)

No. 35
- Position: Defensive back

Personal information
- Born: August 5, 1937; Greenville, South Carolina, U.S.
- Died: August 4, 2020 (aged 82)
- Listed height: 6 ft 0 in (1.83 m)
- Listed weight: 185 lb (84 kg)

Career information
- High school: St. Mary's of Redford (Detroit, Michigan)
- College: Michigan State

Career history

Playing
- New York Titans (1960); Detroit Redskins (1961)

Coaching
- Melvindale HS (MI) (1961–1965) Assistant coach; Northwest Missouri State (1966) Defensive specialist; Holy Cross (1967) Defensive backfield coach

Awards and highlights
- AFC All-Star (1961); AFC interceptions leader (1961)
- Stats at Pro Football Reference

Roger J. Donnahoo (August 5, 1937 – August 4, 2020) was an American professional football player who was a defensive back for the New York Titans of the American Football League (AFL). He played college football for the Michigan State Spartans.

== Early life ==
Donnahoo attended St. Mary of Redford High School in Detroit, Michigan, where he excelled in football, basketball and baseball. In basketball, he was named a Detroit Free Press first-team all-Catholic First Division selection. Donnahoo was reportedly offered a contract by the Baltimore Orioles after his high school graduation. Additionally, he was an All-American halfback on the football team under head coach Dan Boisture.

Donnahoo played three years of college football at Michigan State University. As a sophomore, he was third on the depth chart behind Walt Kowalczyk and Art Johnson, but still averaged 7.9 yards per carry on 11 touches.

== Professional career ==
After graduating from Michigan State, Donnahoo signed with the New York Titans of the American Football League. He started all 14 games as a rookie, recording five interceptions. On September 23, Donnahoo returned a blocked punt 10 yards for the game-winning touchdown with 15 seconds left, giving the Titans a 28–24 victory against the Denver Broncos. On November 24, Donnahoo recovered a fumble and returned it 57 yards for a touchdown in a 41–35 win over the Dallas Texans. However, he suffered a shoulder and sternum injury in the 1961 preseason. Donnahoo was waived by the Titans that August.

In September 1961, Donnahoo signed with the Detroit Redskins of the American Football Conference. He was named a league All-Star after recording a league-leading seven interceptions, which he returned for 134 yards and a touchdown. He also returned a fumble recovery for an 83-yard touchdown, which was the longest returned fumble of the season.

== Coaching career ==
In 1961, Donnahoo was hired as an assistant football coach at Melvindale High School in Melvindale, Michigan, where he remained for five seasons, helping them achieve a 38–6 record.

Donnahoo served as a defensive specialist on the coaching staff at Northwest Missouri State in 1966.

In 1967, Donnahoo was named the defensive backfield coach at Holy Cross by head coach Tom Boisture, whose brother he played for at St. Mary of Redford.

Donnahoo died on August 4, 2020, at the age of 82.
