= Franklin Road Christian School =

Franklin Road Christian School (FRCS) can refer to:

- Franklin Road Christian School (Novi, Michigan)
- Franklin Road Christian School (Tennessee)
