= First Baptist Christian School =

First Baptist Christian School can refer to:

- First Baptist Christian School (Indiana) in Mishawaka, Indiana
- First Baptist Christian School (Louisiana) in Slidell, Louisiana
- First Baptist Christian School (Elyria, Ohio) in Elyria, Ohio
- First Baptist Christian School (Rhode Island) in Warwick, Rhode Island
- First Baptist Christian School (Illinois) in Danville, Illinois
