= William D. Ford =

American politician

William David Ford
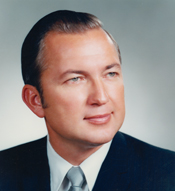

Member of the U.S. House of Representatives from Michigan
- In office January 3, 1965 – January 3, 1995
- Preceded by: District established (redistricting)
- Succeeded by: Lynn Rivers
- Constituency: 15th district (1965-1993); 13th district (1993-1995)

Member of the Michigan Senate from the 21st district
- In office 1963–1964
- Preceded by: Patrick J. Doyle
- Succeeded by: Garry E. Brown

Personal details
- Born: August 6, 1927 Detroit, Michigan, US
- Died: August 14, 2004 (aged 77) Ypsilanti Township, Michigan, US
- Party: Democratic
- Education: University of Denver
- Profession: Attorney

William David Ford (August 6, 1927 – August 14, 2004) was a U.S. representative from Michigan and namesake of the Federal Direct Student Loan Program and William D. Ford Career-Technical Center. Ford was known for his support of workers and educational opportunity. Among his significant legislative accomplishments were authoring the Workers Adjustment and Retraining Notification Act (the "WARN Act" or "Plant Closing Act") and the Middle Income Student Assistance Act, and his key role in passing the Family and Medical Leave Act of 1993. In 1994, the Federal Direct Student Loan Program was named in his honor.

== Biography ==
Ford was born in Detroit and attended Henry Ford Trade School, Melvindale High School, Nebraska State Teachers College, and Wayne State University. His father, a Scottish immigrant, was an autoworker who was killed on the job, an incident that influenced Ford's political views.

He interrupted his studies to serve in the United States Navy during World War II, 1944–1946. He also served in the United States Air Force Reserve from 1950 to 1958.

After the war, he received a B.A. from the University of Denver in 1949, and a J.D. from that university's College of Law in 1951. He was admitted to the bar in 1951 and practiced law in Taylor, Michigan. He was justice of the peace for Taylor Township, 1955–1957; city attorney for Melvindale, 1957–1959; and attorney for Taylor Township, 1957–1964.

He was a delegate to the Michigan constitutional convention, 1961–1962, which drafted the state constitution adopted in 1963. He was a member of the Michigan State Senate, 1963–1964; member and officer of Michigan's Sixteenth District Democratic Organization, 1952–1964; delegate to Michigan Democratic conventions, 1952–1970, and to the Democratic National Convention in 1968. He was elected as a Democrat to the United States House of Representatives for the 89th and the fourteen succeeding Congresses, serving from January 3, 1965 to January 3, 1995.

He was chairman of the U.S. House Committee on Post Office and Civil Service in the 97th through 101st Congresses, and of the Committee on Education and Labor in the 102nd and 103rd Congresses. He did not seek re-election in the 1994 election.

Ford died in 2004 at his home in Ypsilanti Township, Michigan of complications from a stroke and was buried at Arlington National Cemetery.

Despite their shared surname and home state, William D. Ford was not related to either the Henry Ford family or U.S. president Gerald Ford.

U.S. House of Representatives
Preceded by John Dingell	Member of the U.S. House of Representatives from Michigan's 15th congressional district 1965–1993	Succeeded by Barbara-Rose Collins
Preceded by Barbara-Rose Collins	Member of the U.S. House of Representatives from Michigan's 13th congressional district 1993–1995	Succeeded by Lynn Rivers
Political offices
Preceded by James M. Hanley; New York	Chairman of House Post Office and Civil Service Committee; 1981–1991	Succeeded by Bill Clay; Missouri
Preceded by Augustus F. Hawkins; California	Chairman of House Education and Labor Committee; 1991–1995	Succeeded by William F. Goodling; Pennsylvania
