= Victory Christian School =

Victory Christian School can refer to:

- Victory Christian School (Pell City, Alabama)
- Victory Christian School (Carmichael, California)
- Victory Christian School (Conyers, Georgia)
- Victory Christian School (Williamstown, New Jersey)
- Victory Christian School (Albuquerque, New Mexico)
- Victory Christian School (Sylva, North Carolina)
- Victory Christian School (Tulsa, Oklahoma)
