= Mountain Empire (disambiguation) =

Mountain Empire may refer to:

== Places ==
- Mountain Empire, San Diego, a rural area of southeastern San Diego County, California

== Schools ==
- Mountain Empire Community College, a two-year college located in Big Stone Gap, Virginia
- Mountain Empire Baptist School, a former K-12 school located in Bristol, Tennessee

== Other ==
- Mountain Empire Airport, a general aviation airport in Smyth County, Virginia
- A Mountain Empire District, a high school sports conference in Southwest Virginia
