= Melvindale–Northern Allen Park Public Schools =

School district in Michigan, United States

Melvindale-Northern Allen Park Public Schools

Address
- 18530 Prospect Street Melvindale, Wayne County, Michigan, 48122; United States

District information
- Type: Public
- Grades: PreKindergarten-12
- Superintendent: Ryan Vranesich
- Schools: 5
- Budget: $55,065,000 (2022-2023 expeditures)
- NCES District ID: 2623460

Students and staff
- Students: 2,997 (2024-2025)
- Teachers: 145.0 FTE (2024-2025)
- Staff: 327.73 FTE (2024-2025)
- Student–teacher ratio: 20.67 (2024-2025)
- District mascot: Cardinals

Other information
- Website: www.melnapschools.com

Melvindale-Northern Allen Park Public Schools is a public school district in Metro Detroit. It serves parts of Allen Park and Melvindale.

== History ==
The district was organized in 1882, and its first school was built that year. As the population of the district grew during the 1920s, new schools were built, including the Quant School in 1927, which served as the high school.

The former high school on Prospect Street began as an elementary school around 1951 and was designed to become the district's high school with further phases of construction. Eberle M. Smith Associates was the architect. In 1953, the state approved funding for the completion of the building as Melvindale High School.

In fall 2023, the high school moved into the former Baker College campus in Allen Park. The former high school became Strong Middle School.

== Schools ==
Schools in Melvindale-Northern Allen Park Public Schools
School	Address	Notes
Melvindale High School	4500 Enterprise Drive, Allen Park	Grades 9-12
Julian O. Strong Middle School	18656 Prospect Street, Melvindale	Grades 6-8
Mohamed Said Elementary	3303 Oakwood Blvd., Melvindale	Grades 4-5
Allendale Elementary	3201 Oakwood Blvd, Melvindale	Grades K-3
Baby Birds Early Childhood Center	18530 Prospect Street, Melvindale	Grades PreK-K
MelNAP Virtual Academy		Online learning option for grades 6-12.
