= Nansemond County Training School =

- U.S. National Register of Historic Places
- Virginia Landmarks Register
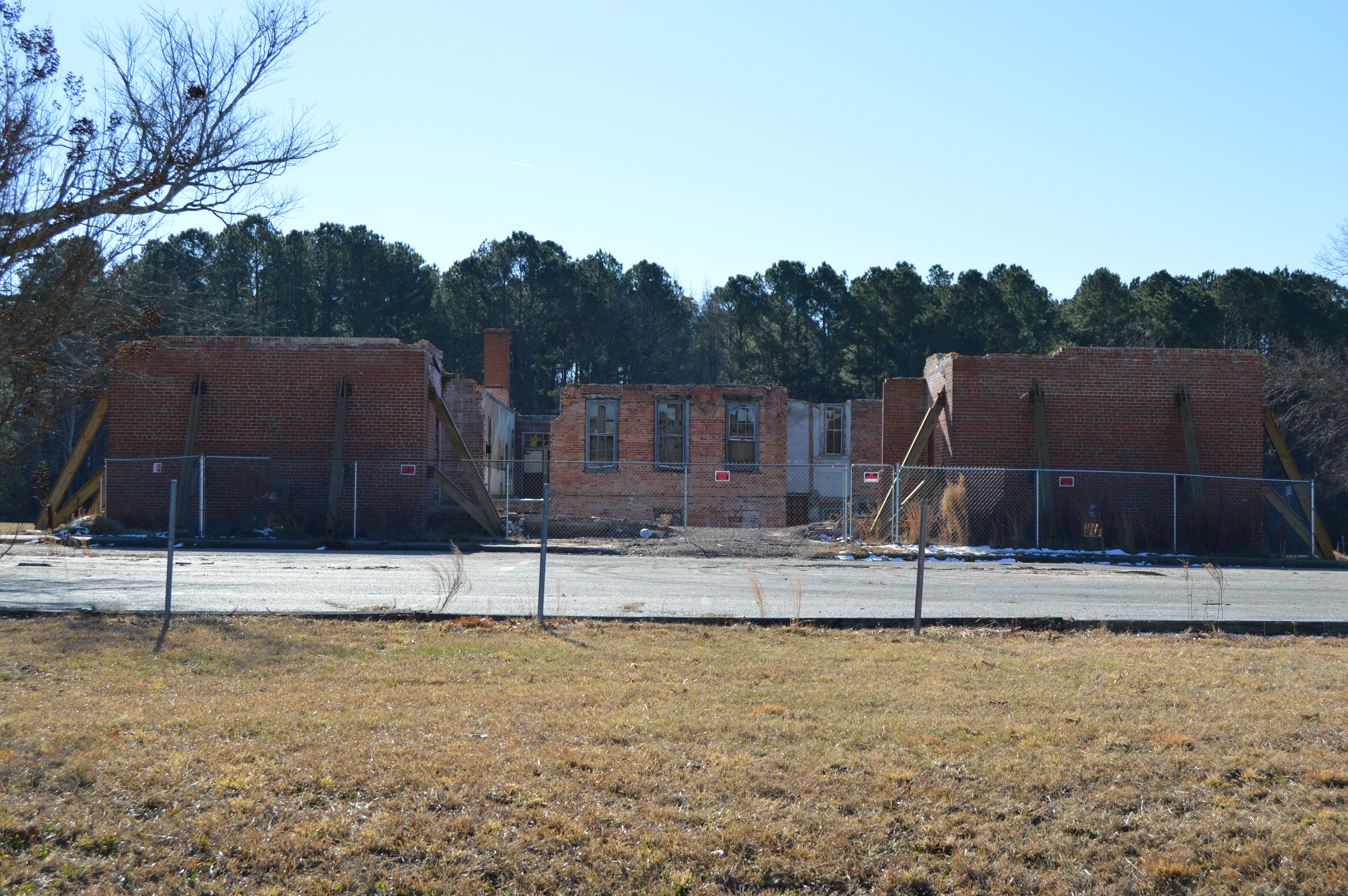
- Front of the school, while undergoing reconstruction in 2018

- Location within Virginia Location within the United States
- Location: 9307 Southwestern Boulevard, Suffolk, Virginia
- Coordinates: 36°38′15″N 76°48′15″W
- Area: Less than 1 acre (0.40 ha)
- Built: 1924
- Architectural style: Late 19th And Early 20th Century American Movements
- MPS: Rosenwald Schools in Virginia MPS
- NRHP reference No.: 04000847
- VLR No.: 133-5065

Significant dates
- Added to NRHP: August 11, 2004
- Designated VLR: June 16, 2004

Nansemond County Training School (1924–1970), also known as Southwestern High School, is a historic building and former Rosenwald School for African-American students located at Suffolk, Virginia, United States.

== History ==
It was built in 1924, and is a one-story building consisting of a central block with a recessed covered porch and flanking wings. It is capped with a tin hipped roof. Also on the property is the contributing cafeteria building that was later used as an extra classroom.

It was built to house the first public black high school in Nansemond County, Virginia, and included both the primary and secondary grades. The school closed following the 1969–70 school year.

It was added to the National Register of Historic Places in 2004.

== See also ==
- Nansemond Collegiate Institute (1905–1939), private black school
- National Register of Historic Places listings in Suffolk, Virginia
