= James Webb III =

American basketball player (born 1993)

- James Webb III

No. 9 – Safiport Erokspor
- Position: Power forward / small forward
- League: Basketbol Süper Ligi

Personal information
- Born: August 19, 1993 (age 33) Augusta, Georgia, U.S.
- Listed height: 6 ft 9 in (2.06 m)
- Listed weight: 215 lb (98 kg)

Career information
- High school: Curtis Baptist (Augusta, Georgia); The Oaks Virtual School (Hilton Head, South Carolina)
- College: North Idaho (2012–2013); Boise State (2014–2016)
- NBA draft: 2016: undrafted
- Playing career: 2016–present

Career history
- 2016–2018: Delaware 87ers
- 2018: Brooklyn Nets
- 2018: →Long Island Nets
- 2018–2019: Telekom Baskets Bonn
- 2019–2020: Iowa Wolves
- 2020–2021: Larisa
- 2021–2022: Murcia
- 2022–2023: Valencia
- 2023–2024: Maccabi Tel Aviv
- 2024: Karşıyaka Basket
- 2025: Liaoning Flying Leopards
- 2025–2026: Unicaja
- 2026–present: Esenler Erokspor

Career highlights
- FIBA Intercontinental Cup champion (2025); Israeli Winner League Champion (2024); First-team All-MWC (2016); Second-team All-MWC (2015); MWC Newcomer of the Year (2015); MWC All-Defensive Team (2015); MWC Champion (2015)
- Stats at NBA.com
- Stats at Basketball Reference

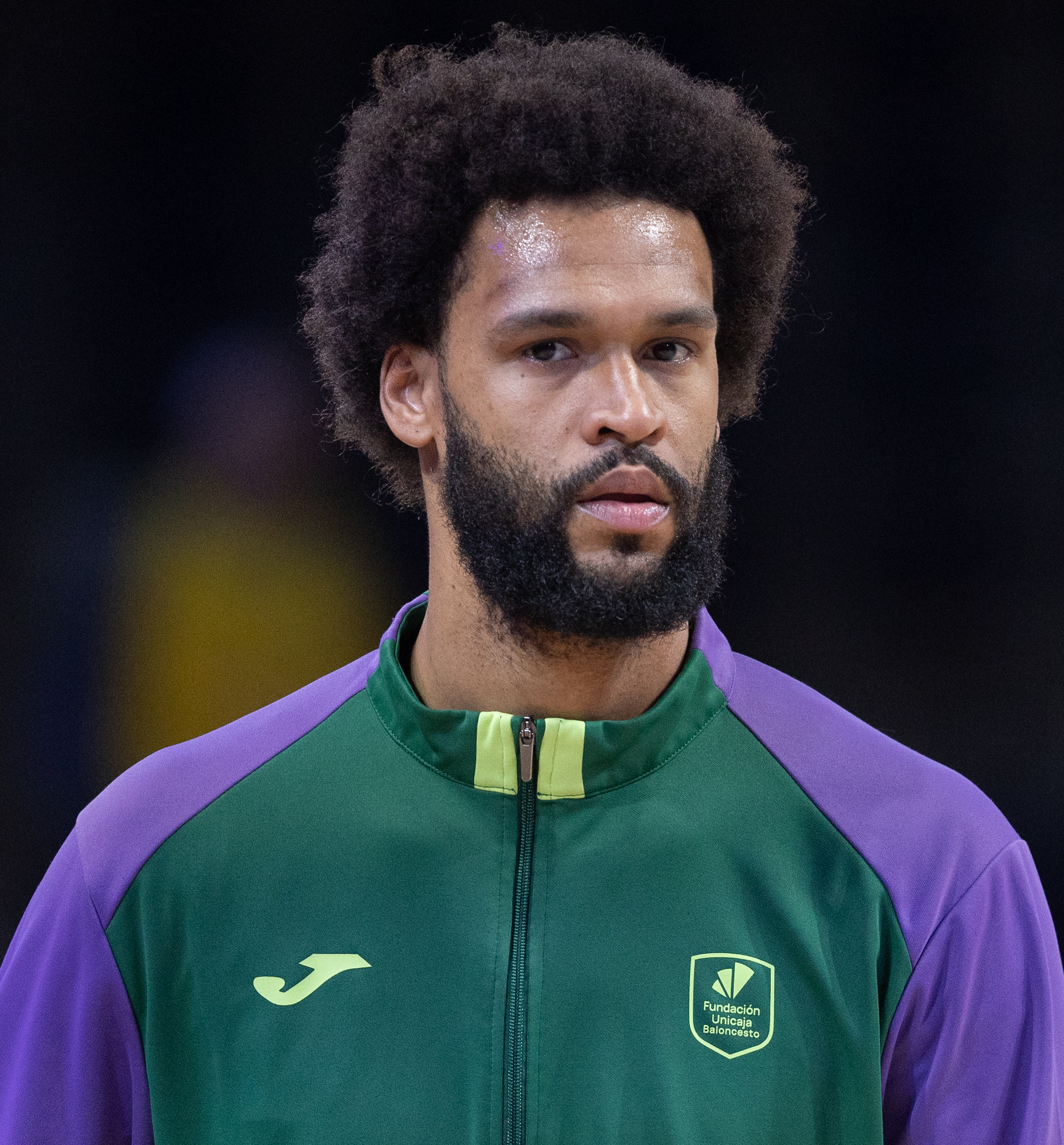
Webb with Unicaja in 2026

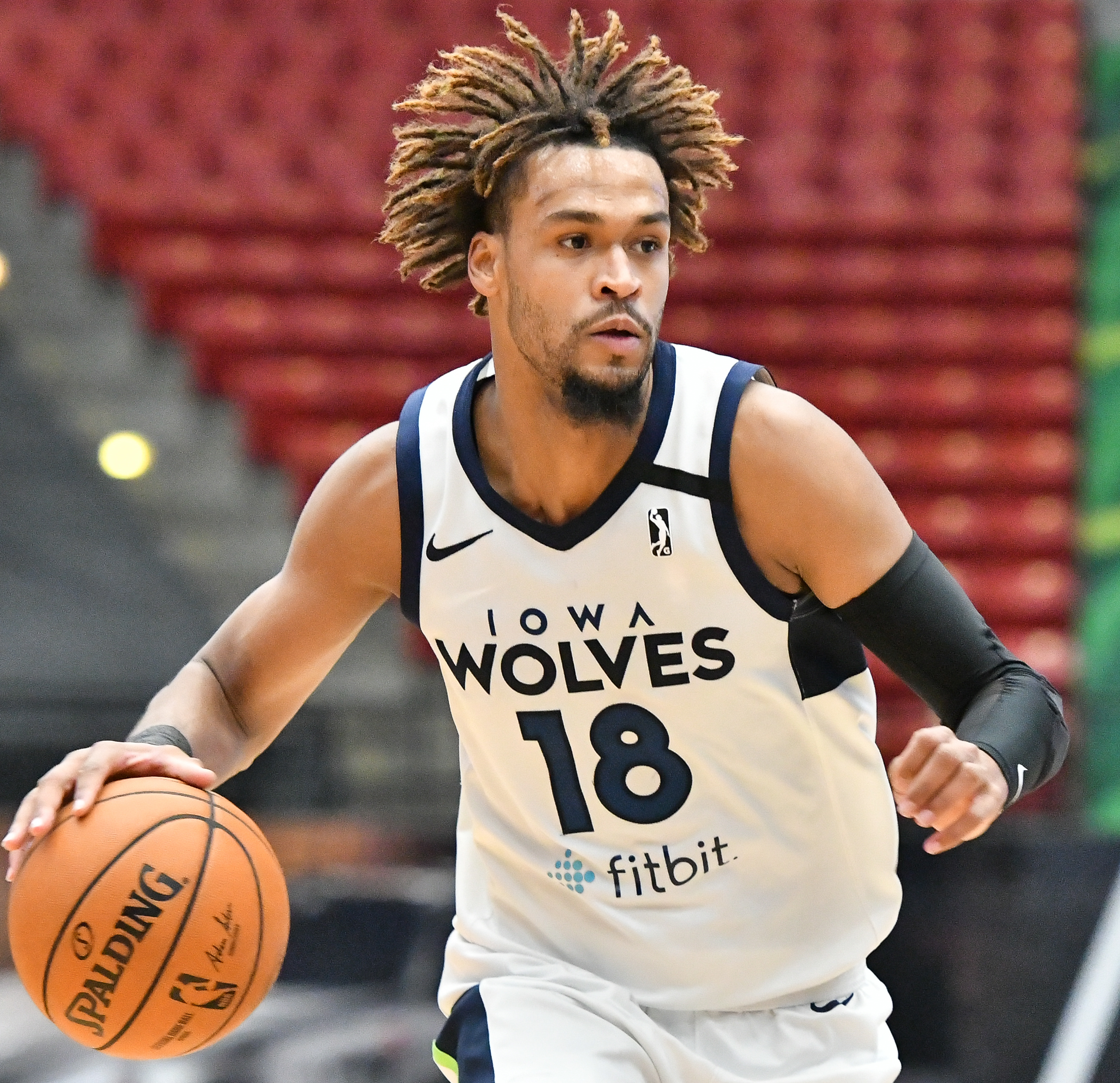
Webb with the Iowa Wolves in 2020

James Leroy Webb III (born August 19, 1993) is an American professional basketball player for Esenler Erokspor of the Basketbol Süper Ligi (BSL). He played college basketball for North Idaho College and Boise State University. He played in the NBA in 2017–18.

== High school career ==
Webb played for Curtis Baptist High School in his hometown of Augusta, Georgia for two years. He then transferred to The Oaks Virtual School (Hilton Head, South Carolina), where he averaged 23 points, nine rebounds, and five assists per game while being named team MVP. He also lettered in tennis, soccer, baseball, track, and cross country during his high school career.

== College career ==
Webb began his college career at North Idaho College. There, in 2012–13 he appeared in all 31 games, including 17 starts. He averaged 9.2 points and 5.2 rebounds per game, shooting 53 percent from the floor and 76.8 percent from the free throw line, and helped the team reach a 26–5 record.

In his sophomore season, he transferred to Boise State University. In 2014–15 he was Mountain West Newcomer of the Year, All-MW Second Team, and All-MW Defensive Team.

The next year he averaged 15.8 points, 9.13 rebounds (7th in team history), and 1.4 steals per game with a .552 field goal percentage as a junior, leading the Broncos in the first two categories. He was named Mountain West Conference Player of the Week three times, USBWA All-District VIII, NABC All-District 17 First Team, and earned First-Team All-MW honors.

On March 27, 2016, Webb announced he would forego his senior season to declare for the NBA draft.

== Professional career ==
=== Delaware 87ers (2016–2018) ===
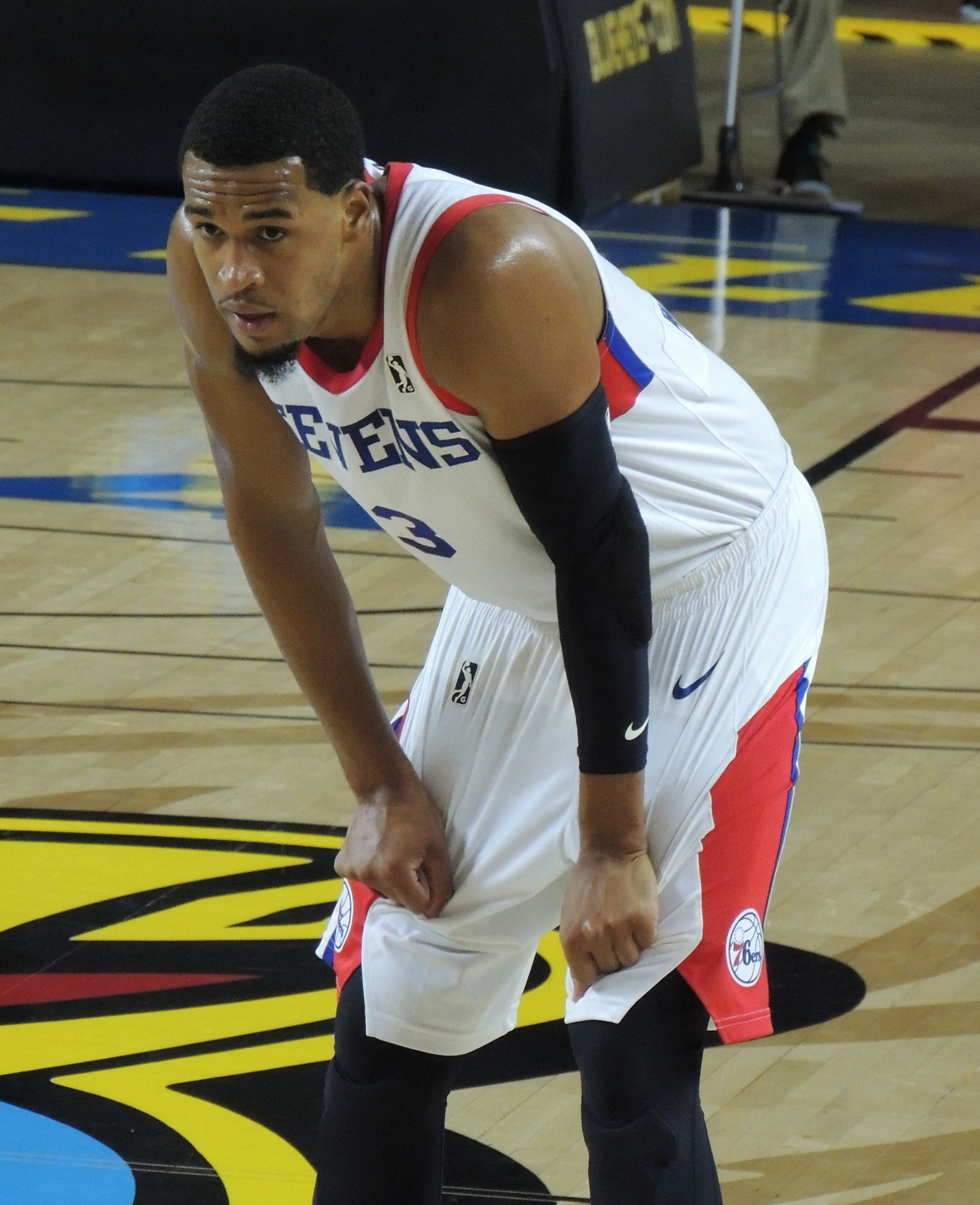
Webb with Delaware in November 2017

After going undrafted in the 2016 NBA draft, Webb joined the Philadelphia 76ers for the 2016 NBA Summer League. On July 8, 2016, he signed with the 76ers, but was waived on October 24 after appearing in six preseason games. Five days later, he was acquired by the Delaware 87ers of the NBA Development League as an affiliate player of the 76ers. On March 7, 2017, Webb was waived after suffering a season-ending ankle injury.

Webb was re-signed by the Delaware 87ers of the NBA Development League for the 2017–18 season.

=== Brooklyn Nets (2018) ===
On January 15, 2018, Webb was signed by the Brooklyn Nets to a two-way contract.

=== Telekom Baskets Bonn (2018–2019) ===
On August 23, 2018, Webb was signed by Telekom Baskets Bonn of the Basketball Bundesliga.

=== Iowa Wolves (2019–2020) ===
On November 15, 2019, the Iowa Wolves announced that they had acquired the returning player right to Webb. Webb had 20 points, 14 rebounds and two assists on January 20, 2020, versus the Greensboro Swarm. He averaged 13.8 points, 8.1 rebounds, and 1.8 assists per game.

=== Larisa (2020–2021) ===
On September 8, 2020, Webb signed overseas with Larisa of the Greek Basket League. In 13 games, he averaged 13.3 points and 9.6 rebounds per contest, attracting the interest of bigger clubs.

=== Murcia (2021–2022) ===
On January 31, 2021, UCAM Murcia announced that Webb had joined their team until the end of the season. He re-signed with the club in the summer of 2021. During the 2021–22 campaign, in 33 league games, Webb averaged 12.1 points and 5.4 rebounds per contest.

=== Valencia (2022–2023) ===
On July 8, 2022, Webb signed a two-year contract with Valencia of the Liga ACB and the EuroLeague. In 32 EuroLeague games, he averaged 8 points and 4.1 rebounds in 21 minutes per contest, on 60.9% 2-point shooting and 38.4% 3-point shooting. Additionally, in 26 Liga ACB matches, he averaged 9.6 points and 4.4 rebounds per contest.

=== Maccabi Tel Aviv (2023–2024) ===
On July 5, 2023, Webb signed a two-year deal with Israeli powerhouse Maccabi Tel Aviv.

=== Karşıyaka Basket (2024) ===
On July 11, 2024, Webb signed with Karşıyaka Basket of the Basketbol Süper Ligi (BSL).

=== Liaoning Flying Leopards (2025) ===
On January 10, 2025, Webb signed with the Liaoning Flying Leopards of the Chinese Basketball Association (CBA).

=== Unicaja Malaga (2025–2026) ===
On June 20, 2025, he signed with Unicaja of the Spanish Liga ACB.

=== Esenler Erokspor (2026–present) ===
On June 17, 2026, he signed with Esenler Erokspor of the Basketbol Süper Ligi (BSL).

== Career statistics ==
Legend
GP	Games played	GS	Games started	MPG	Minutes per game
FG%	Field-goal percentage	3P%	3-point field-goal percentage	FT%	Free-throw percentage
RPG	Rebounds per game	APG	Assists per game	SPG	Steals per game
BPG	Blocks per game	PPG	Points per game	PIR	Performance index rating
**Bold**	Career high

=== NBA ===
==== Regular season ====
Year	Team	GP	GS	MPG	FG%	3P%	FT%	RPG	APG	SPG	BPG	PPG
2017–18	Brooklyn	10	0	12.0	.250	.211	—	2.4	.4	.1	—	1.6
Career		10	0	12.0	.250	.211	—	2.4	.4	.1	—	1.6

=== EuroLeague ===
Year	Team	GP	GS	MPG	FG%	3P%	FT%	RPG	APG	SPG	BPG	PPG	PIR
2022–23	Valencia	32	**23**	**21.5**	**.459**	**.384**	.583	**4.1**	**.6**	**.9**	**.4**	**8.0**	**7.7**
2023–24	Maccabi Tel Aviv	**39**	2	15.7	.419	.330	**.776**	3.2	.5	.5	.3	6.2	6.0
Career		71	25	18.3	.440	.360	.712	3.6	.5	.7	.3	7.0	6.7

=== Basketball Champions League ===
Year	Team	GP	GS	MPG	FG%	3P%	FT%	RPG	APG	SPG	BPG	PPG
2018–19	Baskets Bonn	14	12	24.0	.459	.288	.700	5.4	1.4	.5	.2	8.1
Career		14	12	24.0	.459	.288	.700	5.4	1.4	.5	.2	8.1

=== Domestic leagues ===
Year	Team	League	GP	MPG	FG%	3P%	FT%	RPG	APG	SPG	BPG	PPG
2016–17	(United States) Delaware 87ers	D-League	39	34.8	.447	.359	.756	9.3	1.1	1.3	.8	13.1
2017–18	(United States) Delaware 87ers	G League	21	27.4	.420	.366	.735	6.7	1.4	1.3	.2	11.6
2017–18	(United States) Long Island Nets	G League	19	30.2	.407	.374	.872	6.7	1.4	1.2	.8	14.3
2018–19	(Germany) Baskets Bonn	BBL	29	26.6	.470	.344	.830	8.1	1.8	.8	.6	13.8
2019–20	(United States) Iowa Wolves	G League	27	19.6	.365	.300	.848	4.2	.9	.6	.4	6.0
2020–21	(Greece) Larisa	HEBA A1	13	33.8	.473	.485	.818	9.6	1.0	1.2	.4	13.3
2020–21	(Spain) UCAM Murcia	ACB	17	25.0	.450	.387	.744	6.6	.9	1.1	.2	10.1
2021–22	(Spain) UCAM Murcia	ACB	33	23.4	.468	.359	.769	5.4	.5	1.1	.4	12.1
2022–23	(Spain) Valencia	ACB	26	21.3	.474	.361	.742	5.5	.4	1.0	.3	9.6
2023–24	(Israel) Maccabi Tel Aviv	Ligat HaAl	14	21.6	.451	.371	.813	6.0	.5	.6	.4	8.4

=== College ===
Year	Team	GP	GS	MPG	FG%	3P%	FT%	RPG	APG	SPG	BPG	PPG
2013–14	Boise State	Redshirt										
2014–15	Boise State	**32**	27	27.7	**.552**	**.409**	.655	8.0	.6	1.1	**.6**	11.2
2015–16	Boise State	31	**31**	**30.5**	.494	.248	**.684**	**9.1**	**1.1**	**1.4**	**.6**	**15.8**
Career		63	58	29.0	.518	.330	.676	8.6	.8	1.3	.6	13.5
