= Allen Park High School =

School in Allen Park, Michigan, United States

Coordinates: 42.248752°N 83.225486°W

Location
- 18204 Champaign Street; Allen Park, Michigan 48101-2210; United States

Information
- Established: 1950
- School district: Allen Park Public Schools
- Superintendent: Michael Darga
- Principal: Jason Skiba
- Teaching staff: 59.96 (on an FTE basis)
- Enrollment: 1,136 (2023–2024)
- Student to teacher ratio: 19.94
- Colors: Green and white
- Nickname: Jaguars
- Team name: Allen Park Jags
- Rivals: Gibraltar Carlson, Trenton, THE WOO
- Newspaper: Jaguar Journal
- Feeder schools: Allen Park Middle School
- Website: aphs.allenparkschools.com

Student assessments
- 2021–22 school year Change vs. prior year

M-STEP 11th grade proficiency rates (Science / Social Studies)
- Advanced %: 17.7 / 12.1
- Proficient %: 30.5 / 29.0
- PR. Proficient %: 17.3 / 51.2
- Not Proficient %: 34.5 / 7.7

Average test scores
- SAT Total: 967.7 (▼ −15.8)

Allen Park High School is a secondary school in Allen Park, Michigan, United States. It is operated by Allen Park Public Schools. Allen Park High was established in 1950. Prior to then, Allen Park School District students attended Detroit Southwestern High School, Lincoln Park High School, or Melvindale High School.

== Notable alumni ==
- Glenn Gulliver, former MLB player
- Jakob Marsee, MLB player
- Peter McWilliams, writer, activist
- Tom Tresh, former MLB player (New York Yankees, Detroit Tigers)
- John Varvatos, fashion designer and television personality

== Notable faculty ==
- Glenn Gulliver, former MLB player; baseball coach at school
- Cory Schlesinger, Football player
