= Pauline C. Morton =

American activist (1912–2004)

Pauline Cauthorne Morton (February 19, 1912 - February 8, 2004) was an African-American schoolteacher and activist.

== Early life and education ==
Morton was born in Dunnsville, Virginia, and attended Ozena Public School, Dunnsville Public School, and the Rappahannock Industrial Academy, graduating in 1928. She matriculated at Virginia State University, from which she graduated with a bachelor's of science degree in education in 1933; she later received a master's degree in education from Cornell University. She married Samuel Percell Morton, who was the principal of Hayden High School in Franklin, Virginia, and moved with him to that city, where she began a career as a teacher of home economics; she began employment with the Virginia Department of Education in 1947, during the era of segregation, retiring in 1974.

== Career ==
Eventually she became the area state supervisor for the discipline, rising as well to become an officer in the Statewide Home Economics Association. Morton was known for her activities in the community as well as in state and local politics; during her career she chaired both the local school board and community college board, and served on numerous other state and local committees. She was responsible for implementing the federal school lunch program in the area. For over 50 years she was on the board of trustees for the J.R. Thomas Camp, and from 1972 t0 2002 served on the Board of Directors of Senior Services for Southeastern Virginia. She helped to form the Franklin chapter of the National Association for the Advancement of Colored People, in which she held a lifetime membership; she also belonged to the National Council of Negro Women, the Order of the Eastern Star, Alpha Kappa Alpha, and Links, Inc. Other organizations in whose foundation she assisted include the Franklin Cooperative Ministry, The Cosmonettes, and Sesame Street Day Care. Morton was active in her church community as well, chairing its deacon board; in total, she chaired twenty-three organizations during her career. Morton died at the Southampton Memorial Hospital in Franklin, and was survived by two daughters. She was interred in Southview Memorial Park in Franklin.

== Honors ==
Morton received a host of awards for her civic activities. A scholarship in her honor has been established at Virginia State University. In December 2017 the Virginia Department of Historic Resources approved the erection of a historic marker recognizing her contributions to the community, located near Paul D. Camp Community College, on whose board she had served.
