= Allen Park, Michigan =

- City
- City of Allen Park
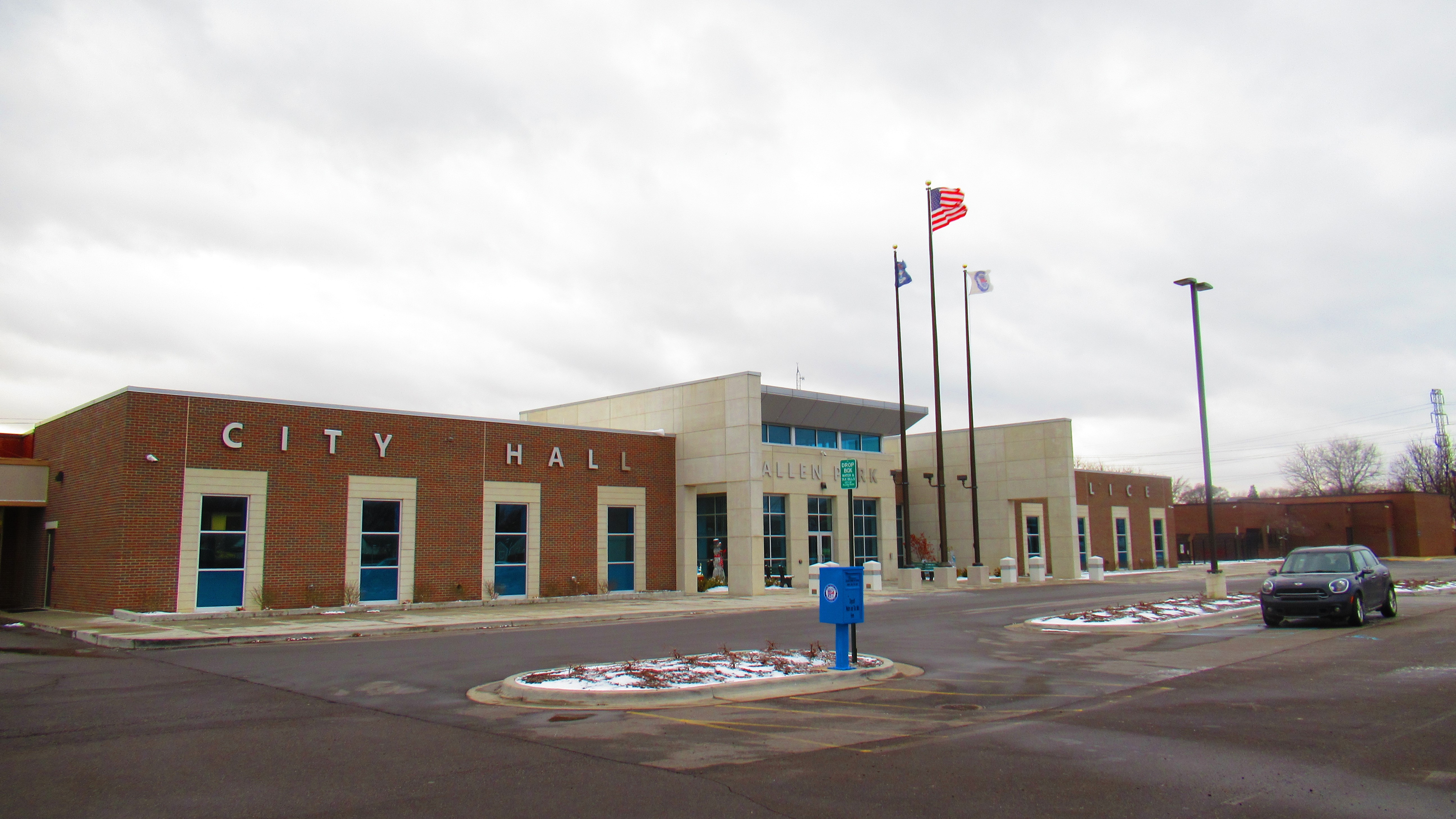
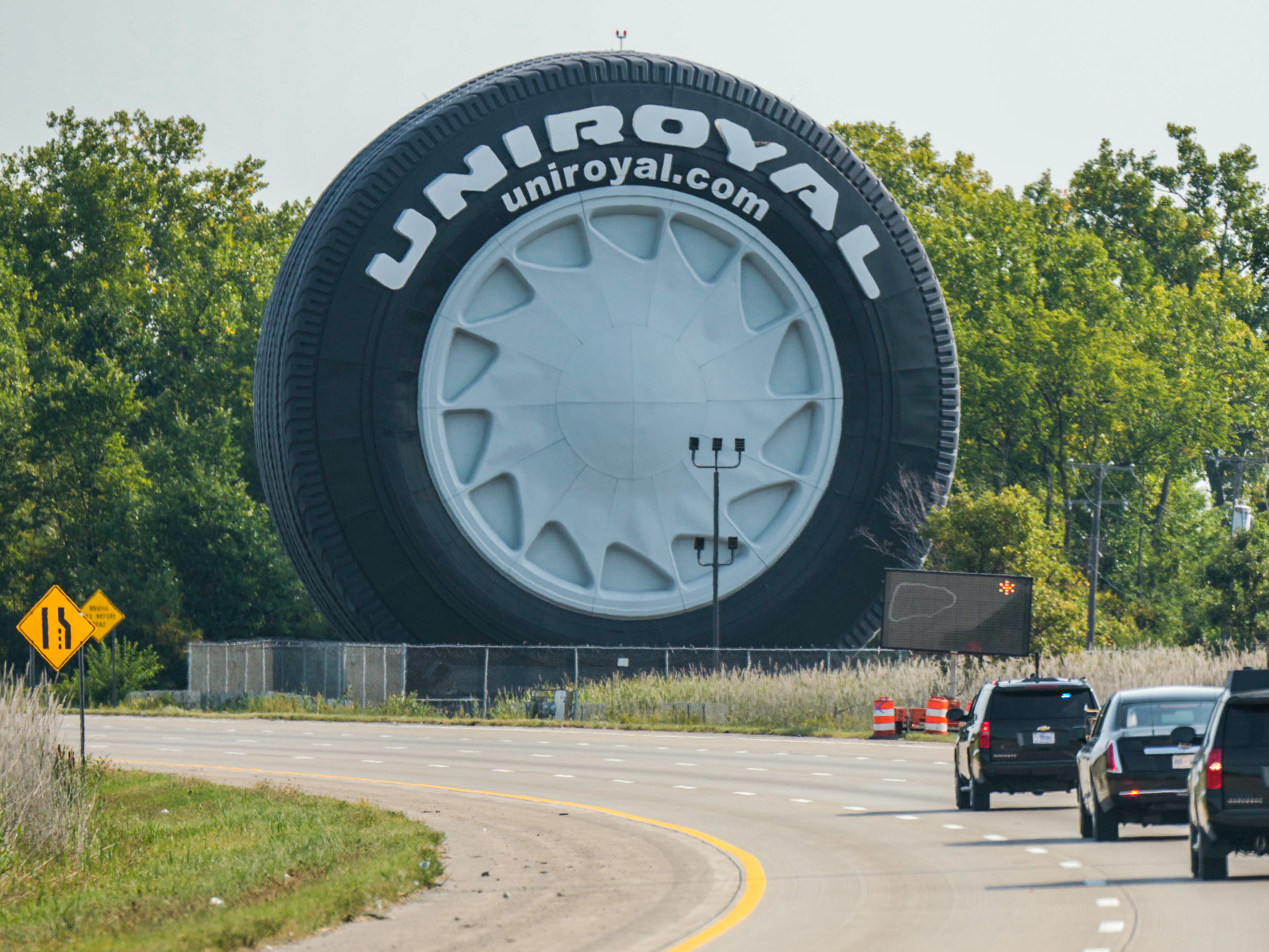
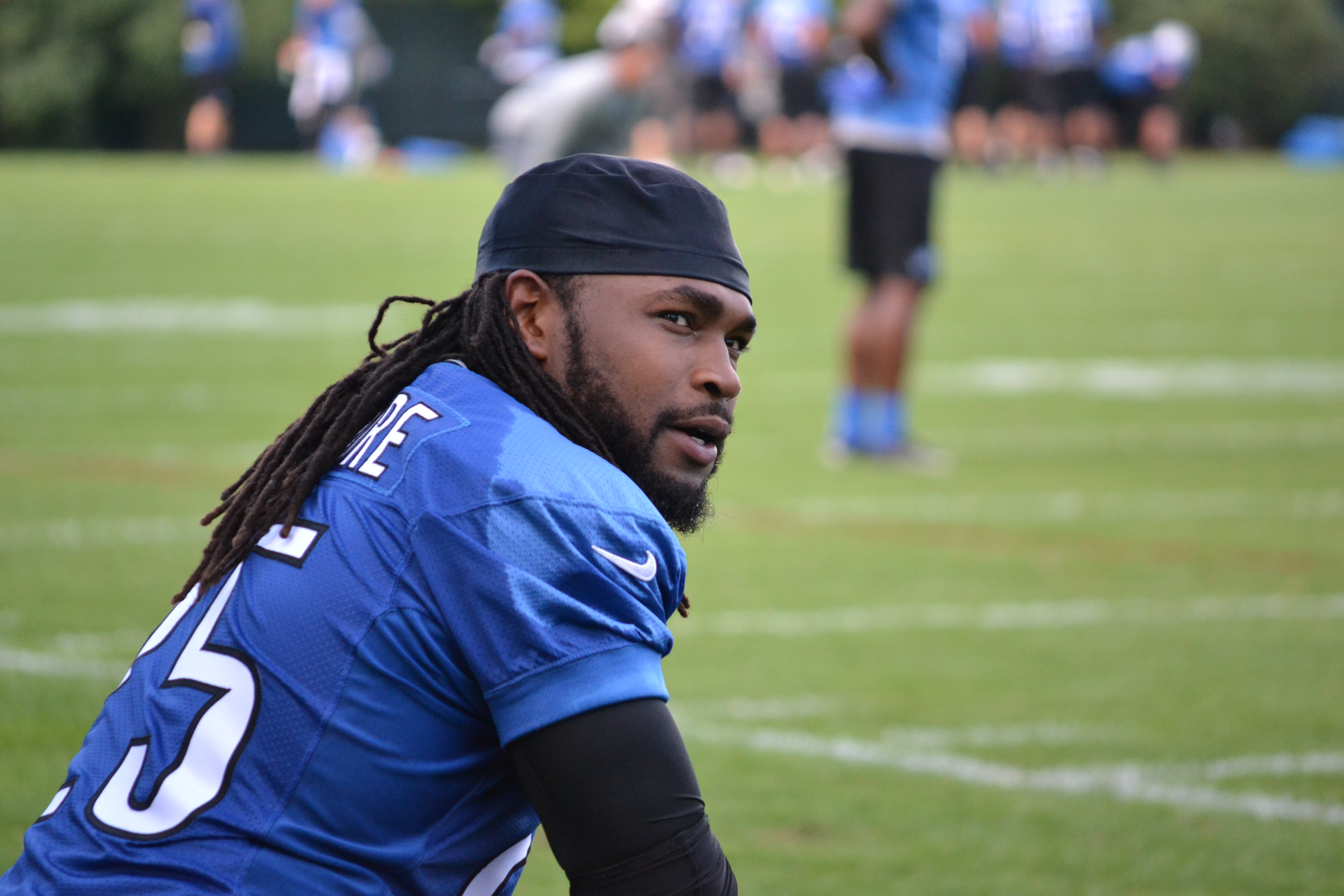
- Clockwise: Allen Park City Hall, Lions in training, Uniroyal Giant Tire

- Seal

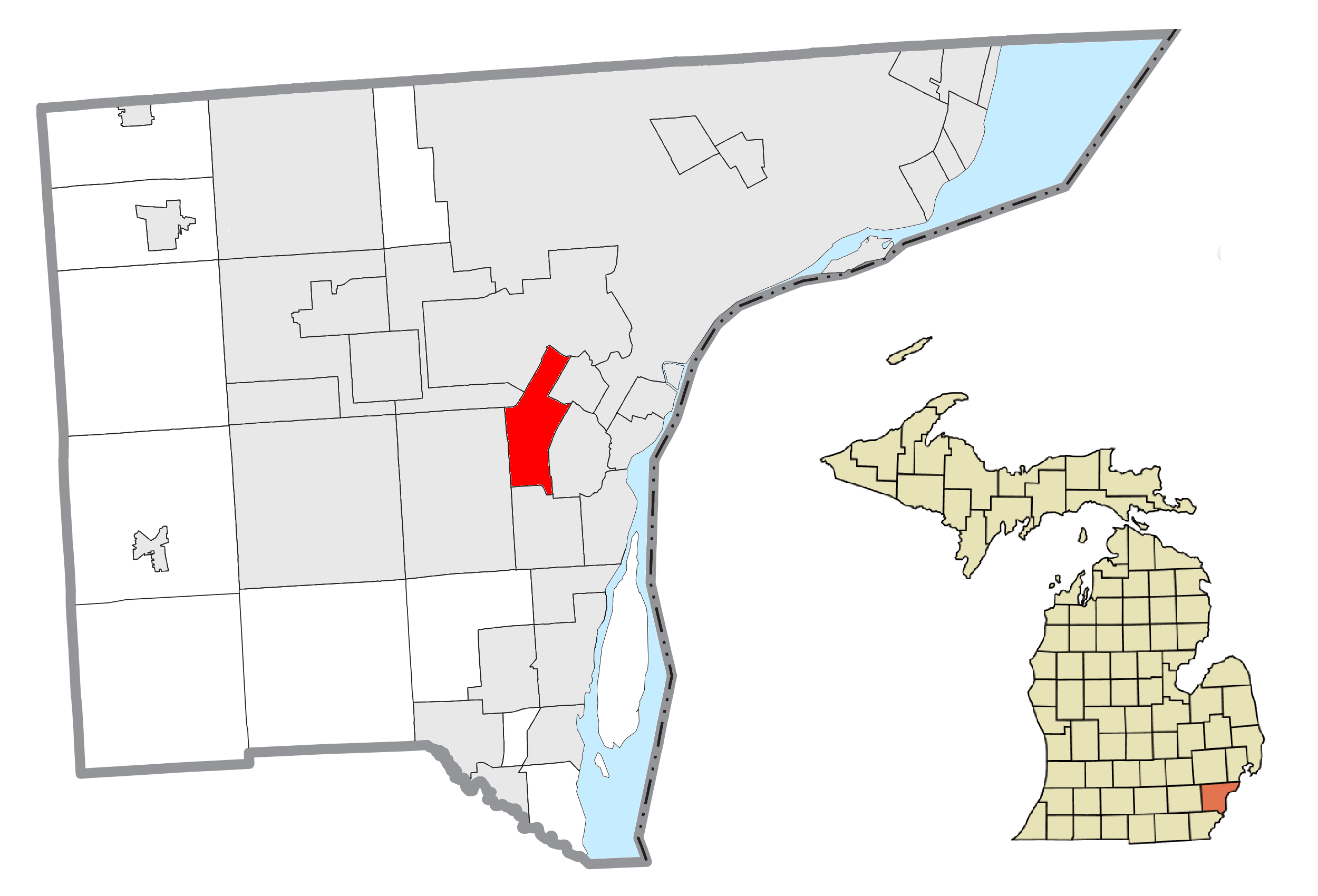
- Location within Wayne County

- Location within the State of Michigan Location within the United States
- Coordinates: 42°15′17″N 83°12′37″W
- Country: United States
- State: Michigan
- County: Wayne
- Incorporated: 1927 (village); 1957 (city)

Government
  - Type: Mayor–council
  - Mayor: Gail McLeod
  - Clerk: Michael Mizzi

Area
  - City: 7.01 sq mi (18.16 km^{2})
  - Land: 7.00 sq mi (18.12 km^{2})
  - Water: 0.015 sq mi (0.04 km^{2})
- Elevation: 594 ft (181 m)

Population (2020)
  - City: 28,638
  - Density: 4,094.3/sq mi (1,580.82/km^{2})
  - Metro: 4,285,832 (Metro Detroit)
- Time zone: UTC-5 (EST)
  - Summer (DST): UTC-4 (EDT)
- ZIP code(s): 48101
- Area code: 313
- FIPS code: 26-01380
- GNIS feature ID: 0619983
- Website: www.cityofallenpark.org

Allen Park is a city in Wayne County in the U.S. state of Michigan. A Downriver suburb of Detroit, Allen Park is located roughly 12 miles (19.3 km) southwest of downtown Detroit. As of the 2020 census, the city had a population of 27,528.

Ford Motor Company is an integral part of the community. Many of the company's offices and facilities lie within the city limits. Since 2002, Allen Park is the practice home of the Detroit Lions football team and is also the site of the team's headquarters. The city is known for its tree-lined streets, brick houses, and the Fairlane Green shopping center that opened in 2006. The city was once recognized in Money Magazine's list of America's Best Small Cities. Allen Park is part of the collection of communities known as Downriver.

Allen Park is home to the Uniroyal Giant Tire, the largest non-production tire scale model ever built, and one of the world's largest roadside attractions. Originally a Ferris wheel at the 1964 New York World's Fair, the structure was moved to Allen Park in 1966.

== Geography ==
According to the United States Census Bureau, the city has a total area of 7.05 square miles (18.26 km^{2}), of which 7.00 square miles (18.13 km^{2}) is land and 0.05 square miles (0.13 km^{2}) (0.71%) is water.

=== Boundaries ===
Allen Park borders Southgate to the South, Lincoln Park to the east, Melvindale to the northeast, Dearborn to the north, Dearborn Heights to the northwest, and Taylor to the west.

=== Major roads ===
- I-75 runs through the southeast corner of Allen Park between Goddard Road and the Lincoln Park border.
- I-94 runs through the northern portion of Allen Park between Pelham Road and the Rouge River.
- M-39, Southfield Road, is an eight-lane boulevard that travels in a northwest–southeast direction between the Lincoln Park border and I-94. It becomes the Southfield Freeway and curves to the northeast after the I-94 interchange.

== History ==
Allen Park was incorporated as a village in 1927, and as a city in 1957. It was named after Lewis Allen, a well-to-do lawyer and lumberman whose 276½ acres of land (primarily in Ecorse Township) included holdings in what are now Allen Park and Melvindale. Hubert Champaign (for whom Champaign Park is named) and Edward Pepper were two other early residents of the area.

In 1950 Allen Park did not include the part of the city directly west of Melvindale; that area was still part of Ecorse Township.

== Demographics ==
Historical population
Census	Pop.	Note	%±
1930	944		—
1940	3,487		269.4%
1950	12,329		253.6%
1960	37,494		204.1%
1970	40,747		8.7%
1980	34,196		−16.1%
1990	31,092		−9.1%
2000	29,376		−5.5%
2010	28,210		−4.0%
2020	28,638		1.5%
U.S. Decennial Census

=== Racial and ethnic composition ===
Allen Park city, Michigan – Racial and ethnic composition Note: the US Census treats Hispanic/Latino as an ethnic category. This table excludes Latinos from the racial categories and assigns them to a separate category. Hispanics/Latinos may be of any race.
Race / Ethnicity (NH = Non-Hispanic)	Pop 2000	Pop 2010	Pop 2020	% 2000	% 2010	% 2020
White alone (NH)	27,174	24,643	22,343	92.50%	87.36%	78.02%
Black or African American alone (NH)	211	588	1,118	0.72%	2.08%	3.90%
Native American or Alaska Native alone (NH)	94	120	77	0.32%	0.43%	0.27%
Asian alone (NH)	232	223	348	0.79%	0.79%	1.22%
Native Hawaiian or Pacific Islander alone (NH)	7	7	9	0.02%	0.02%	0.03%
Other race alone (NH)	15	26	80	0.05%	0.09%	0.28%
Mixed race or Multiracial (NH)	254	329	1,181	0.86%	1.17%	4.12%
Hispanic or Latino (any race)	1,389	2,274	3,482	4.73%	8.06%	12.16%
Total	29,376	28,210	28,638	100.00%	100.00%	100.00%

=== 2020 census ===
As of the 2020 census, Allen Park had a population of 28,638. The median age was 41.5 years. 20.1% of residents were under the age of 18 and 18.0% of residents were 65 years of age or older. For every 100 females there were 95.0 males, and for every 100 females age 18 and over there were 93.5 males age 18 and over.

100.0% of residents lived in urban areas, while 0.0% lived in rural areas.

There were 11,787 households in Allen Park, of which 27.4% had children under the age of 18 living in them. Of all households, 46.6% were married-couple households, 19.1% were households with a male householder and no spouse or partner present, and 27.5% were households with a female householder and no spouse or partner present. About 30.2% of all households were made up of individuals and 13.7% had someone living alone who was 65 years of age or older.

There were 12,252 housing units, of which 3.8% were vacant. The homeowner vacancy rate was 0.9% and the rental vacancy rate was 6.3%.

Racial composition as of the 2020 census
Race	Number	Percent
White	23,283	81.3%
Black or African American	1,139	4.0%
American Indian and Alaska Native	140	0.5%
Asian	358	1.3%
Native Hawaiian and Other Pacific Islander	13	0.0%
Some other race	1,060	3.7%
Two or more races	2,645	9.2%

=== 2010 census ===
As of the census of 2010, there were 28,210 people, 11,580 households, and 7,606 families living in the city. The population density was 4,030.0 inhabitants per square mile (1,556.0/km^{2}). There were 12,206 housing units at an average density of 1,743.7 per square mile (673.2/km^{2}). The racial makeup of the city was 92.9% White, 2.1% African American, 0.5% Native American, 0.8% Asian, 2.0% from other races, and 1.6% from two or more races. Hispanic or Latino residents of any race were 8.1% of the population.

There were 11,580 households, of which 29.1% had children under the age of 18 living with them, 49.1% were married couples living together, 11.6% had a female householder with no husband present, 5.0% had a male householder with no wife present, and 34.3% were non-families. 30.1% of all households were made up of individuals, and 14.3% had someone living alone who was 65 years of age or older. The average household size was 2.42 and the average family size was 3.02.

The median age in the city was 41.7 years. 21.7% of residents were under the age of 18; 7.7% were between the ages of 18 and 24; 24.8% were from 25 to 44; 28.5% were from 45 to 64; and 17.2% were 65 years of age or older. The gender makeup of the city was 48.1% male and 51.9% female.

=== 2000 census ===
As of the census of 2000, there were 29,376 people, 11,974 households, and 8,202 families living in the city. The population density was 4,189.7 inhabitants per square mile (1,617.7/km^{2}). There were 12,254 housing units at an average density of 1,747.7 per square mile (674.8/km^{2}). The racial makeup of the city was 95.6% White, 0.7% African American, 0.36% Native American, 0.81% Asian, 0.02% Pacific Islander, 1.21% from other races, and 1.27% from two or more races. Hispanic or Latino residents of any race were 4.73% of the population. There were 11,974 households, out of which 27.5% had children under the age of 18 living with them, 55.0% were married couples living together, 9.9% had a female householder with no husband present, and 31.5% were non-families. 28.2% of all households were made up of individuals, and 14.9% had someone living alone who was 65 years of age or older. The average household size was 2.43 and the average family size was 2.99.

In the city, 22.2% of the population was under the age of 18, 6.5% was from 18 to 24, 28.2% from 25 to 44, 22.2% from 45 to 64, and 20.9% was 65 years of age or older. The median age was 41 years. For every 100 females, there were 91.0 males. For every 100 women age eighteen and over, there were 88.1 men.

The median income for a household in the city was $51,992, and the median income for a family was $63,350. Males had a median income of $50,143 versus $31,168 for females. The per capita income for the city was $24,980. About 1.9% of families and 3.2% of the population were below the poverty line, including 3.3% of those under age 18 and 4.5% of those age 65 or over.

== Government ==
As of June 2026, the Mayor of Allen Park is Gail McLeod, who has served since 2019.

The City Council consists of six members who serve four-year terms: Nancy Knick, Matthew E. Valerius, Ed Wurtzbacher, Gerald Barr Jr., Gary Schlack, and Dan Loyd. Other elected officials include City Clerk Michael Mizzi and City Treasurer Tim Estheimer.

== Education ==
=== Public schools ===
Most of Allen Park is within the Allen Park School District. The district has three elementary schools: Arno, Lindemann, and Bennie. The district also includes Allen Park Middle School, Allen Park High School, and Allen Park Community School.

The northern part of Allen Park is within the Melvindale-Northern Allen Park Public Schools. Rogers Early Elementary School is within Allen Park. Residents of the district go on to Melvindale High School in Allen Park.

The Southgate Community School District serves Allen Park south of the Sexton-Kilfoil Drain.

Prior to the establishment of Allen Park High School in 1950, education in Allen Park, provided at the Lapham school, ended after the eighth grade. Students in the Allen Park school district had to travel to Detroit Southwestern High School, Lincoln Park High School, and/or Melvindale High School.

=== Private schools ===
Private schools in Allen Park include Inter-City Baptist School and St. Frances Cabrini Schools (including Cabrini High School). Historically religious private schools in Ecorse, River Rouge, and Taylor served Allen Park residents.

== Sports ==
The National Football League's Detroit Lions have their offices and training facility in Allen Park.

In 2009, the Professional Bowlers Association (PBA) announced that Thunderbowl Lanes in Allen Park would be the main site for the inaugural PBA World Series of Bowling. This unique event featured the first seven tournaments of the PBA's 2009–10 season all contested in the same area. One tournament (Motor City Open) was contested in nearby Taylor, Michigan, while the other six (including the PBA World Championship qualifying and match play rounds) took place at Thunderbowl. The 2009 events ran August 2-September 6, with the televised finals being taped by ESPN on September 5–6. Thunderbowl Lanes has hosted additional PBA tournaments since that time, including the five-event PBA Fall Swing in September, 2016 and both the 2018 and 2021 PBA Tour Finals. The World Series of Bowling returned to Thunderbowl Lanes for its tenth anniversary in the 2019 PBA Tour season, with events running March 11–21. Most recently, Allen Park has hosted and the 2025 USBC Masters and PBA Playoffs, and the 2026 USBC Masters.

== Notable residents ==
- Terry Andrysiak, football quarterback
- Jeff Bernard, unlimited hydroplane driver
- John Bizon, member of the Michigan Senate
- Amanda Chidester, softball player
- Ross Couples, aka "Pharmaross" - A contributor to the humor blog of Pulitzer Prize winning Miami Herald syndicated columnist and New York Times best selling author Dave Barry. Ross is also the photographer of the iconic 1976 picture of Paul McCartney and Wings in front of Allen Park's landmark 80-foot tall Uniroyal tire.
- Frank Liberati, former member of the Michigan House of Representatives
- Tullio Liberati, member of the Michigan House of Representatives
- Jennifer Valoppi, journalist
- John Varvatos, fashion designer
