= Curtis Baptist School =

Private Christian high school in Augusta, Georgia, United States

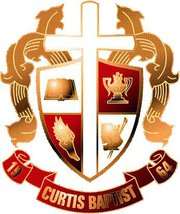

Location
- 1326 Broad Street; Augusta, (Richmond County), Georgia 30909; United States; 33°28′46″N 81°58′35″W

Information
- Established: 1964
- Head of school: Miller Thompson
- Grades: Daycare/Pre-K through 12
- Enrollment: 338 (fall 2019)
- Campus size: 5 acres (20,000 m^{2})
- Campus type: Residential
- Colors: Red, black, and white
- Sports: Tennis, golf, baseball, basketball, scholastic rifle shooting, cross-country, soccer, track, and volleyball
- Mascot: Curtis Crusader
- Nickname: Crusaders
- Team name: Curtis Crusader
- Accreditation: Association of Christian Schools International (ACSI); Cognia; Georgia Accrediting Commission
- Publication: Wildcat Scratch
- Affiliation: Christian (Baptist)
- Website: curtisbaptistchristianschool.org

Curtis Baptist School (CBS) is a private 1-A Christian high school located in Augusta, Georgia, United States. It enrolls more than 300 =students across the elementary, middle, and high schools.

== History ==
The daycare and elementary (K – 6th grade) were established in 1964. 7th and 8th grades were added in 1965. The 9th grade was added in 1970. The remainder of the high school was added and dedicated in 1973.

== Divisions ==
=== Learning Place ===
The Learning Place was created for students grades 1-12 who have learning disabilities. Even students with average or above average intelligence may struggle in some areas. This program is meant to help them learn in an appropriate environment.

=== Elementary school ===
Students take part in daily Bible lessons and participate in chapel once a week. The Stanford Achievement Test is administered annually. Student performance is substantially higher than national and regional averages.

=== High school ===
The high school curriculum is college preparatory, focused on math, science, and literature classes. A Biblical element is integrated into the curriculum. Students have daily in-class Bible studies and attend weekly worship service.

== Athletics ==
About 90% of Curtis students participate in athletics. The school hosts middle school, junior varsity, and varsity level teams. School colors are red and white and the school mascot is "Curtis the Crusader."

=== Championships ===
State Runner-Up

- Softball: 1981
- Boys' soccer: 1982

State Championships

- Boys' soccer: 1980
- Softball: 1982
- Boys' basketball: 1994, 1997, 2013, 2014, 2024
- Girls' basketball: 1996,2025

== Notable alumni ==
- James Webb III (born 1993), basketball player for Maccabi Tel Aviv in the Israeli Basketball Premier League.
