= Rappahannock Industrial Academy =

School in Essex County, Virginia, US (1902–1948)

Coordinates: 37°50.379′N 76°48.154′W

- near Dunnsville, Virginia; United States

Information
- School type: Black Private
- Religious affiliation: Baptist
- Established: 1902
- Founders: Southside Rappahannock Baptist Association
- Closed: 1948

Rappahannock Industrial Academy was a private school for African American students that operated between 1902 and 1948, near Dunnsville in Essex County, Virginia, U.S.. It was founded by the Southside Rappahannock Baptist Association.

== History ==
After the Civil War and Reconstruction, Virginia's Constitution adopted in 1868 provided for public education, but that for African Americans did not extend beyond seventh grade. It existed during a time of racial segregation, and was one of twelve black schools opened in the state of Virginia by the Baptist Church, others included Spiller Academy (1891), Ruffin Academy (1894), the Keysville Mission Industrial Academy (1898), Northern Neck Industrial Academy (1898), Halifax Industrial Institute (1901), Pittsylvania Industrial, Normal, and Collegiate Institute (1903), Bowling Green Industrial Academy (1903), King William Academy (1903), Fredericksburg Normal and Industrial Institute (1905), Nansemond Collegiate Institute (1905), and Corey Memorial Institute (1906).

In 1897, the Southside Rappahannock Baptist Association (which consisted of 38 churches, all but two in Essex, King and Queen or Middlesex Counties) decided to establish an institution to provide Christian education and stress character development for African American children. Jennie Dean had established the Manassas Industrial Academy a few years earlier, which provided higher education (and boarding opportunities) for African American children, but which was too far for most students from the Middle Peninsula.

By 1900, the Site Committee had raised enough money to purchase a 159-acre farm for $1,200, some of which was provided by the Women's Baptist District Missionary Convention, which received 25 acres to establish a home for the aged. For its first year, which began in January 1902, the school used the pre-existing farmhouse, but the following year erected a three-story dormitory to accommodate 45 girls and two teachers, as well as a dining hall, chapel and administrative offices. Soon, a second building could house 30 male students, 2 teachers, 3 classrooms, a library and laboratory. The dormitory (and other use) buildings were named for two of the founding pastors, Reverend C. R. Towles and Dr. R. E. Berkley. An additional 129 acres were purchased in 1927.

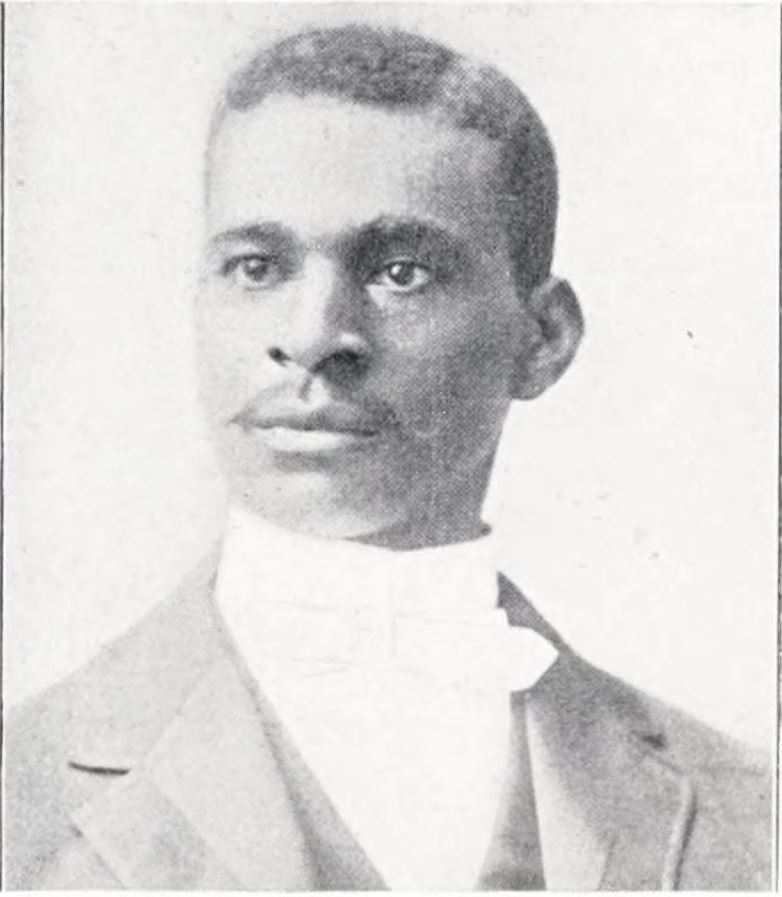
President W. E. Robinson, c. 1910

In 1903 (after several short-term principals), Professor W. Edward Robinson, a Middlesex County native who had graduated from Howard University became the academy's principal, a post he would hold for 29 years (until retiring in 1933). His daughter Edwardine Robinson graduated from the Academy, then attended Hartshorn Memorial College (to obtain a high school diploma), and Virginia Union University in Richmond, Virginia, and returned to teach. Despite its name, the academy offered a college preparatory curriculum, including algebra, geometry, Latin, English and history. A devotional assembly began the students' day, followed by classes beginning at 9 am and ending at 3pm, after which the students could study or engage in recreational activities, including athletics, debating and choral activities. The course was initially 2 years, then expanded to 3 years and received state accreditation in 1934. The school's total operational budget from 1902 – 1948 was $107,000, of which students' tuition and fees contributed $53,965, with the rest contributed by the Southside Rappahannock Baptist Association or products sold by the school.

== Closure and legacy ==
The school closed in 1948, after Howard University Law School graduate Oliver Hill secured a decision of the Virginia Supreme Court requiring free transportation to high schools for students of all races. Essex High School in Tappahannock, Virginia acquired the Academy's records.

In 1992, graduates raised funds to erect a granite historical marker surrounded by a ring of boxwood by the remaining two gateposts. The alumni association also funds one scholarship each year for a student from each of the three original counties, to honor their alma mater.

Notable alumni of the school include civic activist Pauline C. Morton.
