= Mountain Empire Baptist School =

Defunct school in Bristol, Tennessee

Location
- Bristol, United States, Tennessee 37620
- 36.5761°N 82.1735°W

Information
- Denomination: Independent Baptist
- Founded: 2001
- Founder: Bro. Dewey Williams
- Status: Closed
- Closed: 2010
- Principal: Tim Clark
- Faculty: 12.8 (on FTE basis)
- Grades: K–12
- Enrollment: 151 (2007–08)
- Student to teacher ratio: 11.8:1
- Language: English
- Colors: Red; Black
- Fight song: "Have No Fear, Ye Mountaineers"
- Sports: Basketball, 8-man football, Volleyball
- Mascot: Mountaineer
- Affiliation: Belle Meadows Baptist Church
- Website: https://web.archive.org/web/20100302121409/http://mebsonline.org:80/

Mountain Empire Baptist School was a private Baptist K-12 Christian school, and was a ministry of Belle Meadows Baptist Church. Started in 2001, it was member of the Tennessee Association of Christian Schools.

With old fashioned style worship and preaching from the King James Bible (1611), it was a Baptist school without apologizing for doctrine, heritage, nor for zeal.

Their goal was to not take the place of the Christian home, but seek to complement it. The curriculum used for all grades was A Beka. Subjects were taught from a Biblical viewpoint and were based upon the firm foundation of spiritual truth. Social development was encouraged through the teaching of good manners, high moral standards, respect for parents and authority, and patriotism.

== Athletics ==
8 man football 2007 TAACS Tennessee State Champions

MEBS Retired Numbers 11 - Andrew King 06-10 Basketball(all-time leading scorer), Football, Baseball 10 - Charli Fricker volleyball, basketball.
