= Dunnsville, Virginia =

Unincorporated community in Virginia, United States

- Unincorporated community
- Location within Virginia Location within the United States
- Coordinates: 37°51′27″N 76°49′11″W
- Country: United States
- State: Virginia
- County: Essex
- Elevation: 118 ft (36 m)
- Time zone: UTC-5 (Eastern (EST))
  - Summer (DST): UTC-4 (EDT)
- Area code: 804
- GNIS feature ID: 1492891

Dunnsville is an unincorporated community in Essex County, in the U.S. state of Virginia. U.S. Route 17, which transects the community, has a roadside historical marker commemorating the Rappahannock Industrial Academy. Natives of the community include Pauline C. Morton.
