= Temple Christian School (Dayton, Ohio) =

Location
- 1617 Ohmer Ave. Dayton, Ohio 45410; USA; 39°44′59″N 84°08′25″W

Information
- Type: Private secondary
- Established: 1967
- Founder: Dr. Gerald O Fleming
- Grades: K4-12
- Enrollment: 70
- Colors: Black & Gold
- Website: www.templechristiandayton.com

Temple Christian School is a private, Christian secondary school in the ministry of Cornerstone Baptist Temple. The school is located in Dayton, Ohio, and serves approximately 200 students. Temple Christian's mascot is the tiger. Their motto is "A Quality Education in a Christian Environment".

When the school was founded in 1968, the school's president said that he hoped parents would enroll because public schools taught evolution and had "communistic influences" in social studies texts.

Some historians have said that Temple Christian was part of the segregation academy movement. In 1972, the church's pastor said that school integration was immoral since the Bible said that black and white people should remain separated. When Dayton public schools were desegregated in the late 1970s, the school's enrollment nearly doubled.

Temple Christian School won the National Association of Christian Athletes (NACA) Division II Soccer Championship three years in a row - 1982, 1983 and 1984.
