= Baptist Park School =

Location
- 12501 South Telegraph Road; Taylor, Michigan 48180; 42°12′55″N 83°16′1″W

Information
- Type: Christian School (tuition funded)
- Established: 1974
- Principal: Roger Allen Cook
- Enrollment: 213
- Colors: White, Blue
- Mascot: Wildcat
- Website: baptistparkschool.com

Baptist Park School, located in Taylor, Michigan, USA, was a private Baptist Christian school that opened in 1974 and closed in 2016 due to declining enrollment. The school was founded by the Gilead Baptist Church. Baptist Park school offered classes from preschool through twelfth grade. It was a private, co-educational school, which stressed Baptist religious principles.

In 2007–08 there were 213 students.
