= Inter-City Baptist School =

Location
- 4700 Allen Road; Allen Park, Michigan 48101; United States
- Coordinates: 42°16′08″N 83°11′59″W

Information
- Religious affiliation: Baptist
- Principal: Jim Hubbard
- Teaching staff: 20.3 (on an FTE basis)
- Grades: K–12
- Enrollment: 238 (2015-16)
- Student to teacher ratio: 11.7
- Colors: Purple and gold
- Athletics conference: Michigan Independent Athletic Conference
- Nickname: Chargers
- Rival: parkway/oakland
- Website: www.icbschool.org

Inter-City Baptist School is a Baptist school located in Allen Park, Michigan. It was opened in 1966 and includes students ranging from kindergarten to twelfth grade.

== Athletics ==
The Inter-City Baptist Chargers compete in the Michigan Independent Athletic Conference. The school colors are purple and gold. The following MHSAA sanctioned sports are offered:

- Baseball (boys)
- Basketball (girls and boys)
- Golf (boys)
- Soccer (girls and boys)
- Softball (girls)
- Volleyball (girls)
