= Macon Road Baptist School =

Defunct private school in the United States

Location
- Arlington, Tennessee; Memphis, Tennessee; United States; 35.2002973°N 89.6880489°W

Information
- Type: Private
- Religious affiliation: Baptist
- Established: 1973
- Closed: 2023
- NCES School ID: 01611904; A0503322
- Faculty: 54
- Grades: PreK–12
- Enrollment: 612 (2015)
- Student to teacher ratio: 9:1
- Colors: Blue, Black and White
- Mascot: Kingsmen
- Affiliations: American Association of Christian Schools
- Website: www.maconroadbaptist.org

Macon Road Baptist School was a private Baptist Christian school with several locations in the Memphis, Tennessee area.

== Overview ==
Macon Road's main campus, which housed grades K–12, was originally located in the Berclair neighborhood of Memphis. The school eventually opened locations in the Memphis suburbs of Arlington, Lakeland, and Oakland (Fayette County). In the 2010s, Macon Road had around 500 K3–12 students, around 200 of which in the 7–12th grades. The school mascot was the Kingsmen and the colors were blue, black, and white.

== History ==
Macon Road Baptist Church opened the school in 1973 in the church's Berclair Road campus. The school was part of a wave of private schools formed by white parents seeking to avoid sending their children to racially integrated public schools.

Dr. Wayne Webb headed the school from 1974 to 2021. In March 2014, Macon Road became accredited through the Southern Association of Colleges and Schools Council on Accreditation and School Improvement (SACS CASI), an accreditation division of AdvancED.

In 2014, the school closed its Berclair campus; both the school and Macon Road Baptist Church moved to Arlington. The Berclair campus then became a satellite campus for the Frayser-based charter school Memphis Business Academy.

In 2023, the school announced plans to re-open.

== Academics ==
Macon Road used the Abeka curriculum, which has been described as Christian Nationalist revisionism, even describing slavery as "black immigration". All students were required to take a Bible class from K3–12th grade; the school only accepted the King James Version of the Bible.

Elective courses included several Advanced Placement and dual enrollment courses, yearbook, personal fitness, Christian ethics, and various higher level sciences and math classes including anatomy and physiology, physics, and advanced math.
