= Melvindale High School =

Public high school in Allen Park, Michigan

- 4500 Enterprise Dr, Allen Park, MI 48101; United States

Information
- Type: Public
- Established: 1882
- School district: Melvindale-Northern Allen Park Schools
- Teaching staff: 45.00 (on FTE basis)
- Grades: 9 to 12
- Enrollment: 979 (2023-2024)
- Student to teacher ratio: 21.76
- Colors: Red & White
- Mascot: Cardinal
- Website: https://melvindale.melnapschools.com/

Student assessments
- 2021–22 school year Change vs. prior year

M-STEP 11th grade proficiency rates (Science / Social Studies)
- Advanced %: 13.1 / 6.0
- Proficient %: 16.1 / 26.8
- PR. Proficient %: 17.9 / 45.8
- Not Proficient %: 53.0 / 21.4

Average test scores
- SAT Total: 889.1 (▼ −55.2)

Melvindale High School is a public school located in Allen Park, Michigan, which is in the Downriver area. This school is offered to students that are in grades 9-12. It is within the Melvindale-Northern Allen Park School District and it also serves northern portions of Allen Park.

== History ==
Melvindale High School was first built as a one-room school house in 1882. In 1923, the second room for this school house was added on. Since the population of the surrounding area grew, many bonds were granted to the district and Quandt School (MHS's former name) was finally established by 1927. Now, there are four schools within the district: Melvindale High School (9-12), Strong Middle School (6-8), Allendale Elementary (2-5), and Rogers Early Elementary (K-1).

In a period prior to 1950, Melvindale was one of the schools serving high school students from the Allen Park School District. That year, Allen Park High School opened.

At the beginning of the 2023-2024 school year, Melvindale High School moved into the old Baker College campus in Allen Park located at 4500 Enterprise Dr., Allen Park, MI 48101. In 2025, the school's new gymnasium dubbed the "Cardinal Dome" opened which will host all MHS athletic events.

== Athletics ==
Melvindale High School is a member of the Downriver League. Sports offered here are: Basketball (Boys & Girls), Baseball (Boys), Wrestling (Boys), Volleyball (Girls), Track and field (Boys & Girls), Cheerleading (Girls), Softball (Girls), Bowling (Boys & Girls), Football (Boys), and Soccer (Boys & Girls). Their major sports rival is with Allen Park High School. The rivalry between these two schools is called "The Battle of Two Brothers". Allen Park is considered the "Big Brother" in this rivalry because it is a bigger school in a bigger city, Melvindale High School is the "Little Brother". Allen Park, Michigan neighbors Melvindale.

== Notable alumni ==
- Al Cicotte, played Major League Baseball with the New York Yankees, Minnesota Twins, Detroit Tigers, Cleveland Indians, St. Louis Cardinals, and Houston Astros.
- William D. Ford, U.S. Representative from Michigan
- Mickey Goodwin (class of 1976), professional boxer.
