= Sugar Creek Christian Academy =

Private Christian school in Ironton, Ohio, United States

Location
- 4824 State Route 141; Ironton, (Lawrence County), Ohio 45638; United States
- Coordinates: 38°32′53″N 82°36′57″W

Information
- Type: Private Christian
- Religious affiliation: Baptist
- Pastor: Mike Long
- Grades: 9-12
- Colors: Blue and White
- Team name: Eagles
- Website: www.sugarcreekmbc.com/academy.html

Sugar Creek Christian Academy is a private Christian high school in Ironton, Ohio. In 2022, Sugar Creek Christian Academy participated in Ohio Valley School's first National Archery in the Schools Program tournament.
