= Northern Neck Industrial Academy =

School in Ivondale, Virginia, US (1898–1938)

Coordinates: 37.845°N 76.664°W

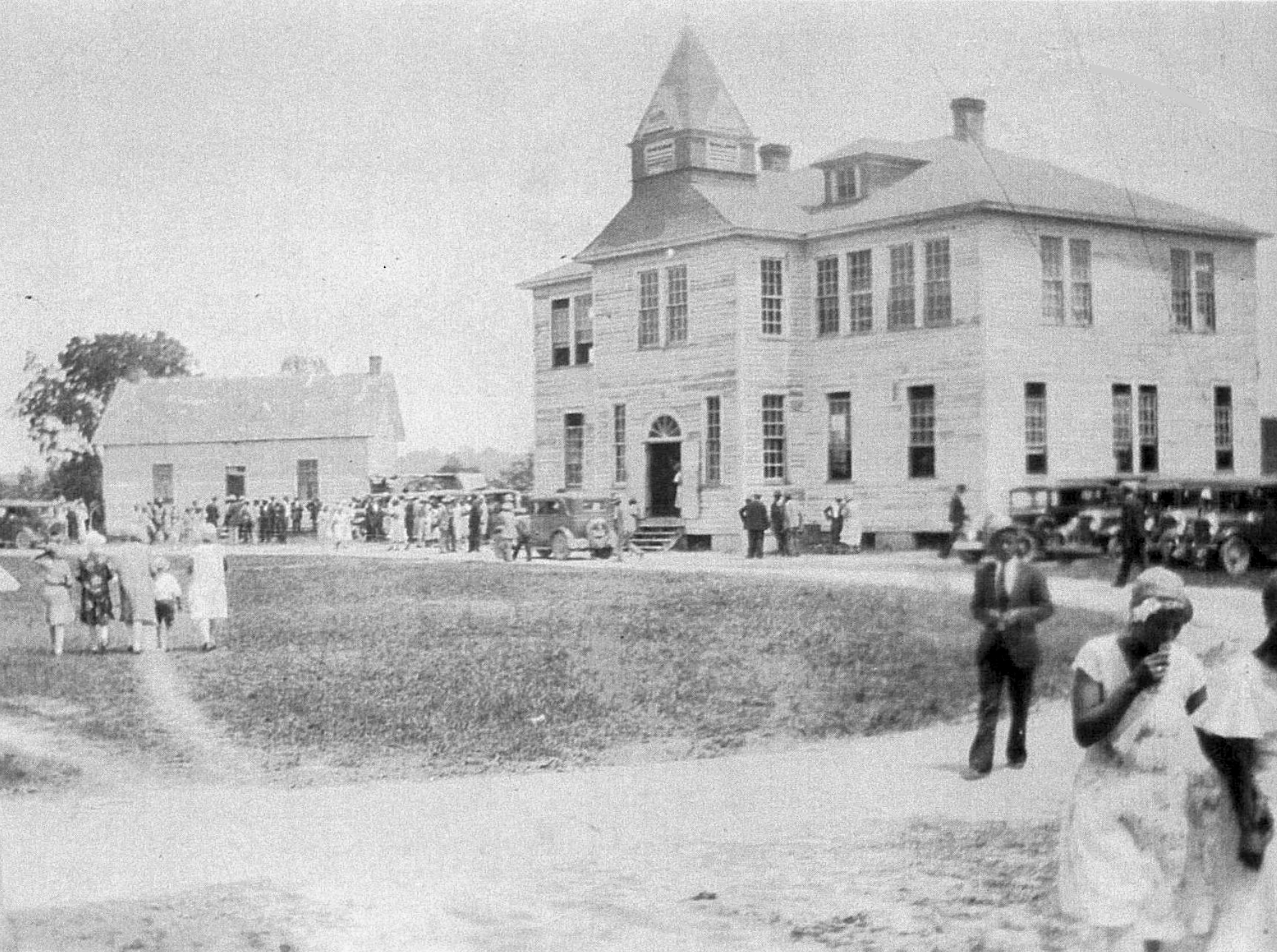
- Northern Neck Industrial Academy, c. 1900
- Route 608 at Oak Hill Farm, Ivondale, Virginia, United States

Information
- School type: Black Private
- Religious affiliation: Baptist
- Established: 1898, opened 1901
- Founders: Baptists of Northern Neck Association, C. C. Baker
- Closed: 1938

Northern Neck Industrial Academy (1898–1938) was a private school for African American students in Ivondale, in the Northern Neck region, Richmond County, Virginia, U.S. It was founded by the Baptists of Northern Neck Association, and served students from surrounding counties by offering dormitories. The school site in Farnham, Virginia has a historical marker erected 2004 by the department of historic resources.

== History ==
It was established in 1898 by the Baptists of Northern Neck Association, and C. C. Baker was a patron of the school. It existed during a time of racial segregation, and was one of twelve black schools opened in the state of Virginia by the Baptist Church, others included Spiller Academy (1891), Ruffin Academy (1894), the Keysville Mission Industrial Academy (1898), Halifax Industrial Institute (1901), Rappahannock Industrial Academy (1902), Pittsylvania Industrial, Normal, and Collegiate Institute (1903), Bowling Green Industrial Academy (1903), King William Academy (1903), Fredericksburg Normal and Industrial Institute (1905), Nansemond Collegiate Institute (1905), and Corey Memorial Institute (1906).

The school opened its doors on October 1, 1900, or 1901, and contained five buildings on 100 acres (40 ha). Principals included J. W. Tynes, and his wife Lucy Rich Tynes.

The school closed in 1938, after the opening of Richmond County Intermediate (later known as Richmond County High School). None of the academy buildings still exist.
