= Millers Creek Christian School =

Private Christian school in North Carolina

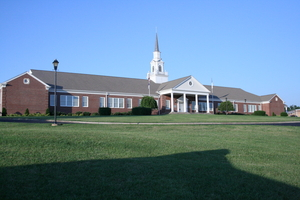

Location
- 5100 Boone Trail; Millers Creek, North Carolina 28651; United States; 36°11′14″N 81°14′04″W

Information
- School type: Private
- Religious affiliation: Christian
- Denomination: Baptist
- Established: 1997 (29 years ago)
- Head of school: Laura Sturgill
- Teaching staff: 14.0 (on an FTE basis)
- Grades: PK–12
- Enrollment: 191, including 36 preschool students (2015–16)
- Student to teacher ratio: 11.1
- Colors: Royal blue and white
- Nickname: Lions
- Website: www.mccslions.org

Millers Creek Christian School is a private, coeducational Christian school located in Millers Creek, North Carolina. The school was founded by, and is operated through, the Millers Creek Baptist Church. The school was established in 1997 and includes instruction from prekindergarten through high school grade 12.

== Demographics ==
The demographic breakdown of the 155 K-12 students enrolled in 2015-16 was:

- Asian – 0.6%
- Black – 4.5%
- Hispanic – 1.9%
- White – 93.0%
