= Ivondale, Virginia =

Unincorporated community in Virginia, US

Coordinates: 37°51′06″N 76°40′06″W

Ivondale is an unincorporated community in Richmond County, in the U.S. state of Virginia.

It was once the home of Northern Neck Industrial Academy (1898–1938), a private African American school founded by the Baptist Church.
