= Trinity Christian School (Arkansas) =

Location
- 3107 Trinity Boulevard; Texarkana, Arkansas 71854; United States; 33°26′20″N 94°1′50″W

Information
- School type: Private
- Religious affiliation: Christian
- Status: Open
- CEEB code: 042404
- NCES School ID: A9500220
- Faculty: 27.9 (on FTE basis)
- Grades: PK–12
- Gender: Co-educational
- Enrollment: 286 (2009–10)
- Colors: Navy blue, white, and orange
- Mascot: Warrior
- Team name: Trinity Christian Warriors
- Accreditation: ANSAA and ACSI
- Website: www.trinitywarriors.org

Trinity Christian School is a private Christian school in Texarkana, Arkansas, United States. TCS is a ministry of Trinity Baptist Church and is accredited by the Arkansas Nonpublic School Accrediting Association (ANSAA) and Association of Christian Schools International (ACSI).

== Extracurricular activities ==
The Trinity Christian School mascot and athletic emblem is the Warrior with navy blue and white with orange accent serving as the school colors.

For 2012–14, Trinity Christian High School participates in the 1A Classification from the 1A 7 East Conference as administered by the Homeland Christian Athletic Association. The Warriors compete in football, volleyball, cross country (boys/girls), basketball (boys/girls), baseball, softball, and track and field (boys/girls).

- Track and field: The boys track team won four consecutive 1A classification state track and field championships (2009, 2010, 2011, 2012). The girls track team won three consecutive state track titles (2008, 2009, 2010).
