= South Side Baptist School =

Location
- 5220 W. 105th St. Oak Lawn, Illinois 60453; United States; 41.7018°N 87.7505°W

Information
- School type: Private School
- Opened: 1975
- Principal: Mr. Robert Burckart
- Grades: K3–12
- Gender: coed
- Campus type: suburban
- Colors: Columbia Blue; Navy
- Athletics conference: IACS
- Mascot: Torchmen
- Newspaper: The Flame
- Yearbook: The Torch
- Website: http://ssbschool.com

South Side Baptist School was a private K3-12th grade Christian school in Oak Lawn, Illinois with a Christian curriculum. South Side Baptist School was founded in 1975 as a ministry of South Side Baptist Church. The school was shut down in the summer of 2019.
