= Allen Park Public Schools =

School district in Michigan, U.S.

Address
- 9601 Vine Ave Allen Park, Wayne, Michigan, 48101; United States

District information
- Motto: An uncompromising commitment to excellence
- Grades: PK–12
- Superintendent: Michael H. Darga
- Schools: 5
- Budget: $70,140,000 2022–2023 expenditures
- NCES District ID: 2602520

Students and staff
- Students: 3,713 (2024–2025)
- Teachers: 204.22 (on an FTE basis) (2024-2025)
- Staff: 436.61 FTE (2024-2025)
- Student–teacher ratio: 18.18 (2024-2025)

Other information
- Website: www.allenparkschools.com

Allen Park Public Schools is a public school district in Allen Park, Michigan in Metro Detroit.

== History ==
Lapham School was built in 1924 at the corner of Allen Road and Ecorse Avenue. Additions were built in 1929 and 1944. It later became North Junior High School.

The district did not have a high school of its own until Allen Park High School opened in 1955. The architect was Eberle M. Smith Associates of Detroit.

In March 2003, voters approved bond issues to fund construction of renovations and additions at district schools, including an auditorium at the high school.

== Schools ==
Schools in Allen Park Public Schools district
School	Address	Notes
Allen Park High School	18401 Champaign Road	Grades 9-12. Built 1955.
Allen Park Middle School	8401 Vine Avenue	Grades 6-8. Formerly South Junior High. Built 1954.
Arno Elementary	7500 Fox Avenue	Grades K-5. Built 1949.
Bennie Elementary	17401 Champaign Road	Grades K-5. Built 1954.
Lindemann Elementary	9201 Carter Avenue	Grades K-5. Built 1952.
Allen Park Center for Early Childhood Education	9601 Vine Avenue	Preschool
