= Southside Baptist Christian School =

Location
- 411 Branchway Dr; Richmond, Virginia 23224; United States
- Coordinates: 37°29′6.9″N 77°29′34.9″W

Information
- School type: Christian School
- Motto: Elite Education Experience
- Head of school: Reginald Stinson
- Grades: K-12
- Language: English
- Colors: black, and gold
- Athletics conference: VISAA Division 3
- Mascot: Hornets
- Website: Official Site

Southside Baptist Christian School is a private Christian school located on the southside of Richmond, Virginia. It is a Christian school and is part of Southside Baptist Ministries. The school is mostly known for its basketball, volleyball and ensemble which perform throughout the city.
