= Ross Corners Christian Academy =

Coordinates: 42.068178°N 76.093735°W

- 2101 Owego Rd. Vestal, NY 13850

Information
- Type: Private
- Religious affiliation(s): Baptist (Christian)
- Established: September 1960
- Administrator: Jennifer Chase
- Grades: Pre-K–12
- Enrollment: 154 (as of 2019-2020)
- Color(s): Blue and white
- Slogan: Educating Minds, Transforming Hearts
- Team name: Rams
- Website: www.rosscornerschristianacademy.org

Ross Corners Christian Academy (RCCA) is an independent private Christian school located in Vestal, New York. It holds grades Preschool through 12th. It is open to all students, even non-Christians. Its colors are blue and white, and their mascot is a ram.

== History ==
The Christian Elementary School opened its doors in September, 1960 to fifty-five pupils, from kindergarten to grade four. Also in 1960 approximately 8 acres (3.2 ha) of land was purchased at the corner of Old Owego Road and Ross Hill Road. In 1961, preschool, as well as grades five and six were added, and plans were made to add one more grade each year through the twelfth grade. In 1965, a ground breaking ceremony was held for the building of the gymnasium. It was completed in September 1966.

The belief statement of the school is written from a fundamentalist and literalist viewpoint.

== Services ==
- Basketball and soccer teams
- School Band
- Music Class
- Art Class
- Gym
- Chess Club
- Speech Club
- P-12th Grade
- Drama Guild
- Student Council
- Chapel
- Office
