= Tennessee Association of Christian Schools =

The Tennessee Association of Christian Schools (TACS) is an organization of Christian schools in Tennessee and Kentucky. It offers accreditation, teacher certification, sports competition and other student activities, and other services to its member schools.

In legislation codified at TCA 49-50-801, the Tennessee General Assembly recognized the TACS as one of several membership organizations authorized to set standards for "church-related schools." The state board of education and local boards of education are prohibited from regulating curriculum or the selection of faculty or textbooks in church-related schools that meet the standards of the TACS.

TACS maintains offices in East Ridge, Tennessee, where it shares an address with the American Association of Christian Schools, of which TACS is a member. It also shares its address and personnel with two publishers of curriculum and other materials for use by Christian educators.

A subsidiary organization, the Tennessee Athletic Association of Christian Schools (TAACS), oversees sports competition among the members. It is not affiliated with the Tennessee Secondary School Athletic Association.
