= Calvary Baptist Theological Seminary =

Former Baptist evangelical seminary located in Lansdale, Pennsylvania

Coordinates: 40.230954°N 75.312974°W

- Type: Private graduate institution
- Active: 1976–2014
- Affiliations: Baptist
- President: Dr. Sam Harbin
- Students: 106
- Location: Lansdale, Pennsylvania, USA
- Campus: Large Suburb
- Website: www.cbs.edu

The Calvary Baptist Theological Seminary (CBS) was a Baptist seminary located in Lansdale, Pennsylvania, a suburb of Philadelphia. It has 558 alumni and provided master's and doctoral degrees to clergy candidates across various conservative Baptist denominations. The school was accredited by the Middle States Commission on Higher Education.

The school was founded by Dr. Robert Jordan, the minister at the Calvary Baptist Church of Lansdale. In 1979, just prior to the graduation of the first class, the state of Pennsylvania approved the school for official seminary designation. Initially offering only a Master's of Divinity degree, a Master's of Theology program was added in 1985. In 1986, the school became a doctoral institute, as it added a Doctor of Divinity program. Two more degrees, which relate to missionary work and religious education, were added in 2004.

In August 2013, it was announced that Calvary Baptist Seminary would be closing at the end of the upcoming academic year. It graduated its last class of 42 students on May 16, 2014. Its building was repurposed as Calvary Baptist Church.
