= Nansemond Collegiate Institute =

School in Virginia, US (1905–1939)

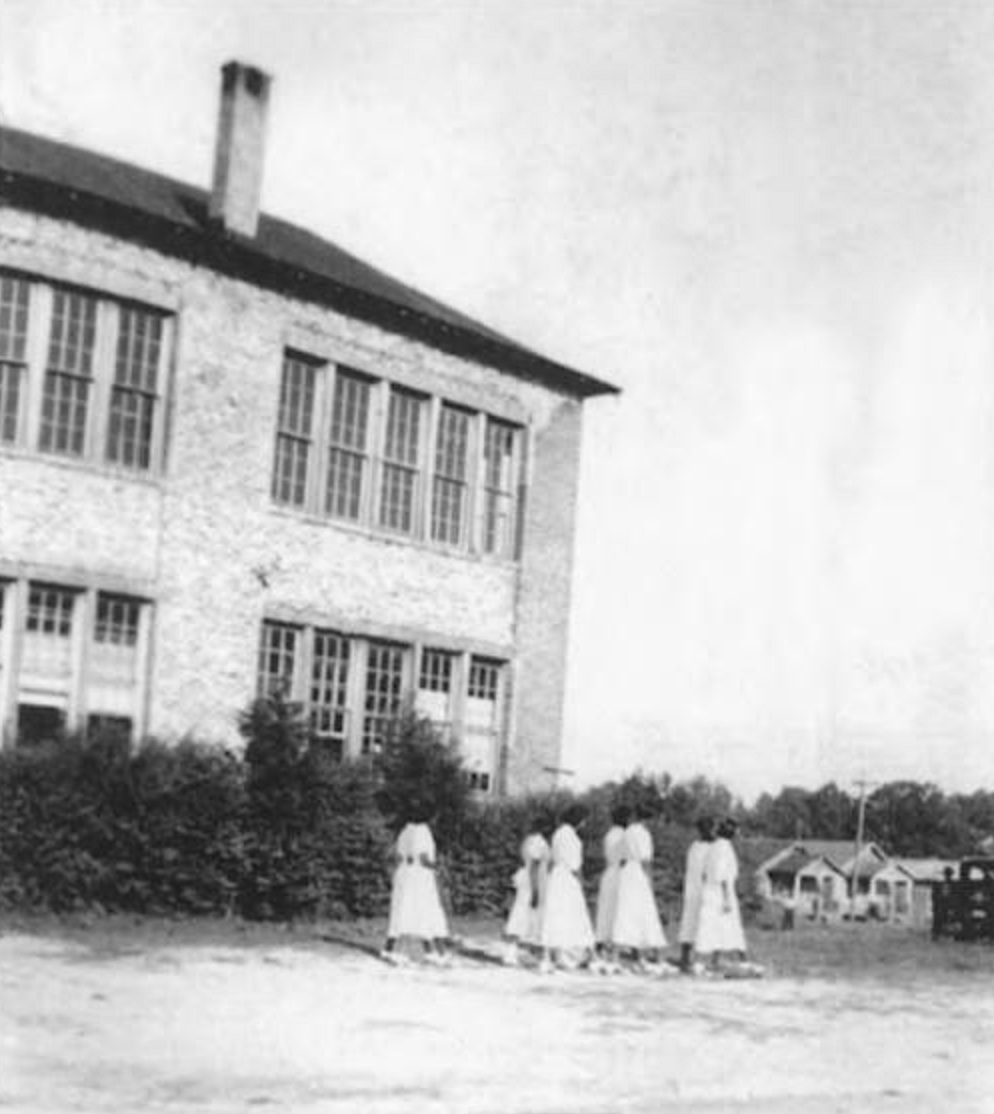

Location
- East Washington St. and North Fifth St., Suffolk (formerly Nansemond County), Virginia; United States; 36.726361°N 76.566450°W

Information
- Other name: Nansemond Industrial Institute, Nansemond Normal and Industrial Institute
- School type: Black Private
- Religious affiliation: Baptist
- Founded: 1905
- Founders: Rev. William Washington Gaines
- Closed: 1939

Nansemond Collegiate Institute (1905–1939) was a private elementary and high school for African American students in Suffolk (formerly Nansemond County), Virginia, United States. It has two historical markers, one was erected as sign in 1988 by the department of conservation and historic resources, and the other is ground plaque a few feet away. It was also known as Nansemond Industrial Institute, and Nansemond Normal and Industrial Institute.

== History ==
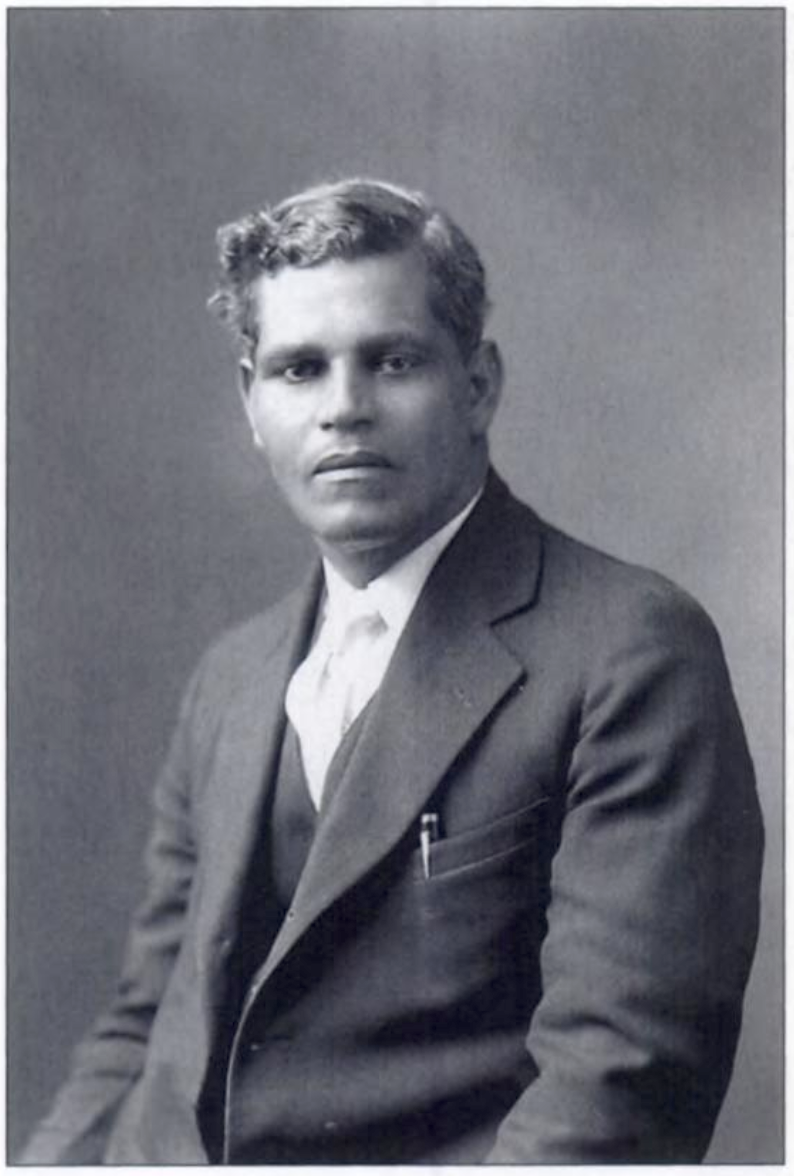
W. A. Huskerson, principal from 1926 to 1939

Rev. William Washington Gaines, the pastor at the First Colored Baptist Church in Nansemond County (now Suffolk), founded the school as the first high school for African American students in the county. It existed during a time of racial segregation, and was one of twelve black schools opened in the state of Virginia by the Baptist Church, others included Spiller Academy (1891), Ruffin Academy (1894), the Keysville Mission Industrial Academy (1898), Northern Neck Industrial Academy (1898), Halifax Industrial Institute (1901), Rappahannock Industrial Academy (1902), Pittsylvania Industrial, Normal, and Collegiate Institute (1903), Bowling Green Industrial Academy (1903), King William Academy (1903), Fredericksburg Normal and Industrial Institute (1905), and Corey Memorial Institute (1906).

William A. Huskerson served as principal from 1926 to 1939, as well as teacher; and his wife Lillian Huskerson taught Latin and algebra at the school. Other principals included Rev. William H. Morris, Rev. Hamilton H. Henderson, Prof. Bruce, and Rev. T.J. Johnson.

The brick campus building was completed in 1927, at the cost of US$25,000. The school had a focus on elementary and high school education, and beginning in 1929 it added a normal school curricula with teacher training. In 1931, the enrollment was 115 students, with 60% of the students from the city of Suffolk. In 1931, Huskerson led a large fundraising effort to pay off the building and aid in school expenses. When fires destroyed portions of a school building, William A. Huskerson worked to rebuild the school buildings by hand.

== Closure and legacy ==
The Nansemond Collegiate Institute closed in 1939, after a series of fires and the building no longer exists. In 2022, the exhibition “The History of Education,” held at Suffolk–Nansemond Historical Society included historical artifacts from the Nansemond Collegiate Institute.

== See also ==
- Nansemond County Training School (1924–1970), first public school in the county
