= Victory Christian School (Williamstown, New Jersey) =

Location
- 1073 New Brooklyn Road; Williamstown, New Jersey
- 39°41′23″N 74°57′57″W

Information
- Type: Private
- Religious affiliation: Baptist
- Established: 1968
- Closed: 2012
- Faculty: 19.5 (on FTE basis)
- Grades: K-12
- Enrollment: 119 (in K-12, plus 6 in Pre-K) (2009-10)
- Student to teacher ratio: 6.1:1
- Colors: Royal Blue and Gold
- Mascot: Warriors

Victory Christian School was a private Christian school located in the Williamstown section of Monroe Township, in Gloucester County, New Jersey, United States. The school was coeducational and Baptist-affiliated, serving students in kindergarten through twelfth grade. The school colors were royal blue and gold, and its athletic teams were known as the "Warriors". The school was a member of the American Association of Christian Schools (AACS).

As of the 2009–10 school year, the school had 119 students (in K-12, plus 6 in Pre-Kindergarten) and 19.5 faculty members (on an FTE basis), for a student–teacher ratio of 6.1:1.
