= Melvindale, Michigan =

- City
- City of Melvindale
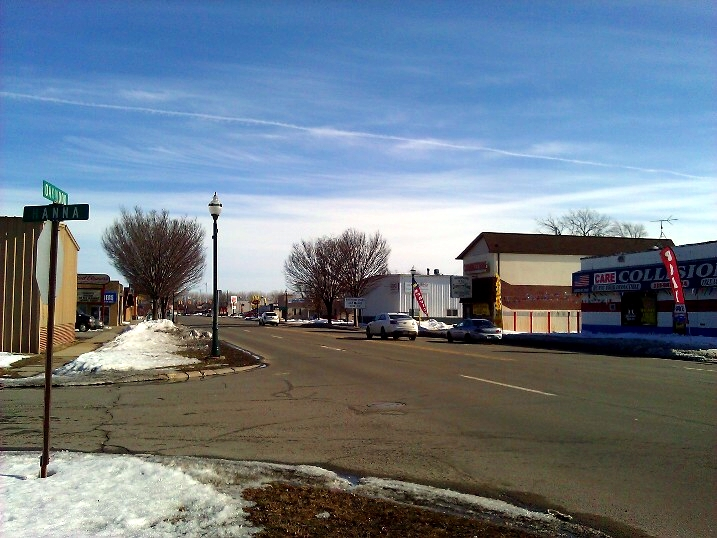
- Oakwood Boulevard and Hanna Street
- Motto: The Little City with a Big Heart
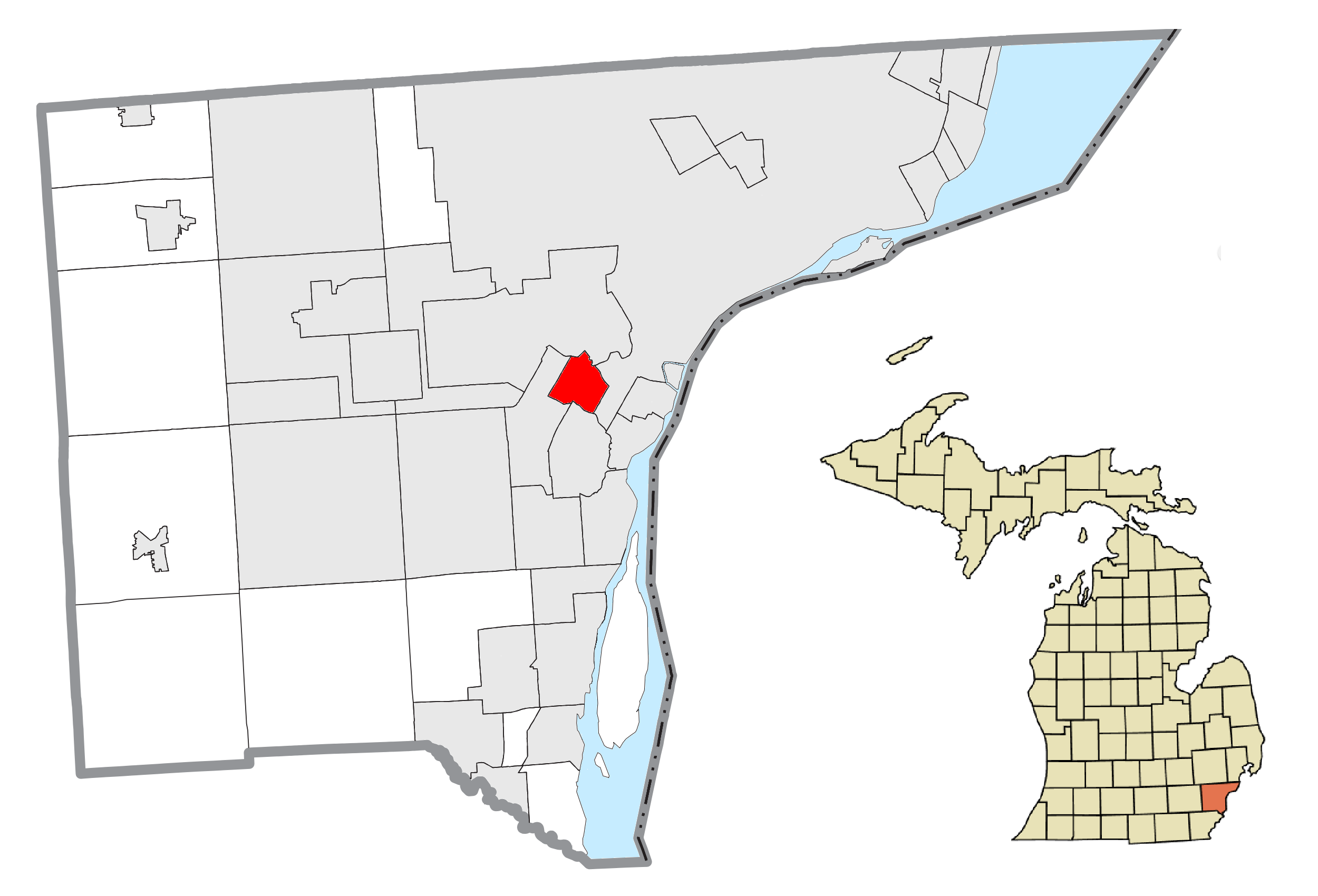
- Location within Wayne County

- Location within the state of Michigan Location within the United States
- Coordinates: 42°16′54″N 83°10′55″W
- Country: United States
- State: Michigan
- County: Wayne
- Incorporated: 1924 (village); 1933 (city)

Government
  - Type: Mayor–council
  - Mayor: Nicole M. Shkira

Area
  - Total: 2.75 sq mi (7.13 km^{2})
  - Land: 2.73 sq mi (7.06 km^{2})
  - Water: 0.023 sq mi (0.06 km^{2})
- Elevation: 587 ft (179 m)

Population (2020)
  - Total: 12,851
  - Density: 4,712.7/sq mi (1,819.58/km^{2})
- Time zone: UTC-5 (EST)
  - Summer (DST): UTC-4 (EDT)
- ZIP code(s): 48122
- Area code: 313
- FIPS code: 26-52940
- GNIS feature ID: 0632086
- Website: melvindale.org

Melvindale is a city in Wayne County in the U.S. state of Michigan. An inner-ring, Downriver suburb of Detroit, Melvindale is located roughly 8 miles (12.9 km) southwest of downtown Detroit. As of the 2020 census, the city had a population of 12,851.

== History ==
Melvindale began as the unincorporated settlement of Oakwood Heights in the northwestern part of Ecorse Township in the early 1920s. The subdivision was designed to house workers from the nearby Ford River Rouge Plant in the city of Dearborn. The city was named after one of the original developers of the settlement, Melvin Wilkinson. The eastern part of Oakwood Heights was annexed by the city of Detroit in 1922, and the remainder was incorporated as the village of Melvindale the same year. In 1933, the village incorporated as a city.

== Geography ==
According to the United States Census Bureau, the city has a total area of 2.76 square miles (7.15 km^{2}), of which 2.72 square miles (7.04 km^{2}) is land and 0.04 square miles (0.10 km^{2}) is water.

Melvindale serves an important role for railroad traffic in Metro Detroit. The Norfolk Southern Railway Oakwood Yard, located along its Detroit District, divides the city into northwest and southeast sides. The Canadian National Railway Dearborn Subdivision serves as the city's western boundary, and the Conrail Shared Assets Lincoln Secondary, serving as a direct route between Detroit and Toledo, Ohio for CSX Transportation trains, passes through industrial areas in the far southeast corner of the city, which is also the location of the remnants of the Conrail Lincoln Yard.

== Demographics ==
Historical population
Census	Pop.	Note	%±
1930	4,053		—
1940	4,764		17.5%
1950	9,483		99.1%
1960	13,089		38.0%
1970	13,862		5.9%
1980	12,322		−11.1%
1990	11,216		−9.0%
2000	10,735		−4.3%
2010	10,715		−0.2%
2020	12,851		19.9%
U.S. Decennial Census

=== Racial and ethnic composition ===
Melvindale city, Michigan – Racial and ethnic composition Note: the US Census treats Hispanic/Latino as an ethnic category. This table excludes Latinos from the racial categories and assigns them to a separate category. Hispanics/Latinos may be of any race.
Race / Ethnicity (NH = Non-Hispanic)	Pop 2000	Pop 2010	Pop 2020	% 2000	% 2010	% 2020
White alone (NH)	8,773	7,135	7,983	81.72%	66.59%	62.12%
Black or African American alone (NH)	556	1,156	1,328	5.18%	10.79%	10.33%
Native American or Alaska Native alone (NH)	69	64	38	0.64%	0.60%	0.30%
Asian alone (NH)	137	83	161	1.28%	0.77%	1.25%
Native Hawaiian or Pacific Islander alone (NH)	4	1	2	0.04%	0.01%	0.02%
Other race alone (NH)	15	18	81	0.14%	0.17%	0.63%
Mixed race or Multiracial (NH)	226	300	777	2.11%	2.80%	6.05%
Hispanic or Latino (any race)	955	1,958	2,481	8.90%	18.27%	19.31%
Total	10,735	10,715	12,851	100.00%	100.00%	100.00%

=== 2020 census ===
As of the 2020 census, Melvindale had a population of 12,851, an increase from 10,715 in 2010 and the first recorded population increase since 1970. The population density was 4,673.1 inhabitants per square mile (1,804.3/km^{2}). The median age was 32.0 years. 29.6% of residents were under the age of 18 and 11.7% were 65 years of age or older. For every 100 females there were 100.7 males, and for every 100 females age 18 and over there were 97.7 males age 18 and over.

100.0% of residents lived in urban areas, while 0.0% lived in rural areas.

There were 4,627 households in Melvindale, of which 35.7% had children under the age of 18 living in them. Of all households, 36.7% were married-couple households, 25.1% were households with a male householder and no spouse or partner present, and 31.4% were households with a female householder and no spouse or partner present. About 32.7% of all households were made up of individuals and 10.8% had someone living alone who was 65 years of age or older.

There were 4,920 housing units, of which 6.0% were vacant. The homeowner vacancy rate was 1.4% and the rental vacancy rate was 7.0%.

Racial composition as of the 2020 census
Race	Number	Percent
White	8,486	66.0%
Black or African American	1,371	10.7%
American Indian and Alaska Native	116	0.9%
Asian	162	1.3%
Native Hawaiian and Other Pacific Islander	2	0.0%
Some other race	1,292	10.1%
Two or more races	1,422	11.1%

=== 2010 census ===
As of the census of 2010, there were 10,715 people, 4,420 households, and 2,601 families living in the city. The population density was 3,939.3 inhabitants per square mile (1,521.0/km^{2}). There were 4,918 housing units at an average density of 1,808.1 per square mile (698.1/km^{2}). The racial makeup of the city was 76.8% White (66.6% non-Hispanic white), 11.3% African American, 0.7% Native American, 0.8% Asian, 6.4% from other races, and 3.9% from two or more races. Hispanic or Latino of any race were 18.3% of the population.

There were 4,420 households, of which 31.2% had children under the age of 18 living with them, 34.4% were married couples living together, 17.9% had a female householder with no husband present, and 6.5% had a male householder with no wife present. 35.5% of all households were made up of individuals, and 11% had someone living alone who was 65 years of age or older. The average household size was 2.42 and the average family size was 3.17.

The median age in the city was 36.5 years. 24.7% of residents were under the age of 18; 9.8% were between the ages of 18 and 24; 27.2% were from 25 to 44; 26.6% were from 45 to 64; and 11.8% were 65 years of age or older. The gender makeup of the city was 48.1% male and 51.9% female.

=== 2000 census ===
As of the census of 2000, there were 10,735 people, 4,499 households, and 2,694 families living in the city. The population density was 3,876.9 inhabitants per square mile (1,496.9/km^{2}). There were 4,760 housing units at an average density of 1,719.0 per square mile (663.7/km^{2}). The racial makeup of the city was 87.40% White, 5.26% African American, 0.75% Native American, 1.29% Asian, 0.04% Pacific Islander, 2.39% from other races, and 2.88% from two or more races. Hispanic or Latino of any race were 8.90% of the population.

There were 4,499 households, out of which 28.6% had children under the age of 18 living with them, 39.6% were married couples living together, 14.8% had a female householder with no husband present, and 40.1% were non-families. 34.5% of all households were made up of individuals, and 12.7% had someone living alone who was 65 years of age or older. The average household size was 2.38 and the average family size was 3.07.

In the city, the population was spread out, with 24.4% under the age of 18, 9.0% from 18 to 24, 31.6% from 25 to 44, 21.5% from 45 to 64, and 13.5% who were 65 years of age or older. The median age was 36 years. For every 100 females, there were 96.1 males. For every 100 females age 18 and over, there were 94.5 males.

The median income for a household in the city was $37,954, and the median income for a family was $46,759. Males had a median income of $38,048 versus $28,026 for females. The per capita income for the city was $19,011. About 7.6% of families and 11.4% of the population were below the poverty line, including 13.3% of those under age 18 and 9.2% of those age 65 or over.

== Notoriety ==
Melvindale became the backdrop for multiple news reports detailing citizen complaints, lawsuits, police reports, and depositions describing a pattern of police brutality from Lt. Matthew Furman.

== Education ==
Melvindale-Northern Allen Park Public Schools serves Melvindale. Melvindale High School is the district's high school.

In 2005 the Roman Catholic Archdiocese of Detroit announced that St. Mary Magdalen Elementary School in Melvindale would close.

== Notable people ==
- Al Cicotte, baseball player
- Mickey Goodwin, light-heavyweight boxer
- Raymond Kalisz, Roman Catholic bishop
- Mike Jolly, played football at the University of Michigan and for the Green Bay Packers
- Jessica Smith, 2014 Olympic speed skater

== Gallery ==
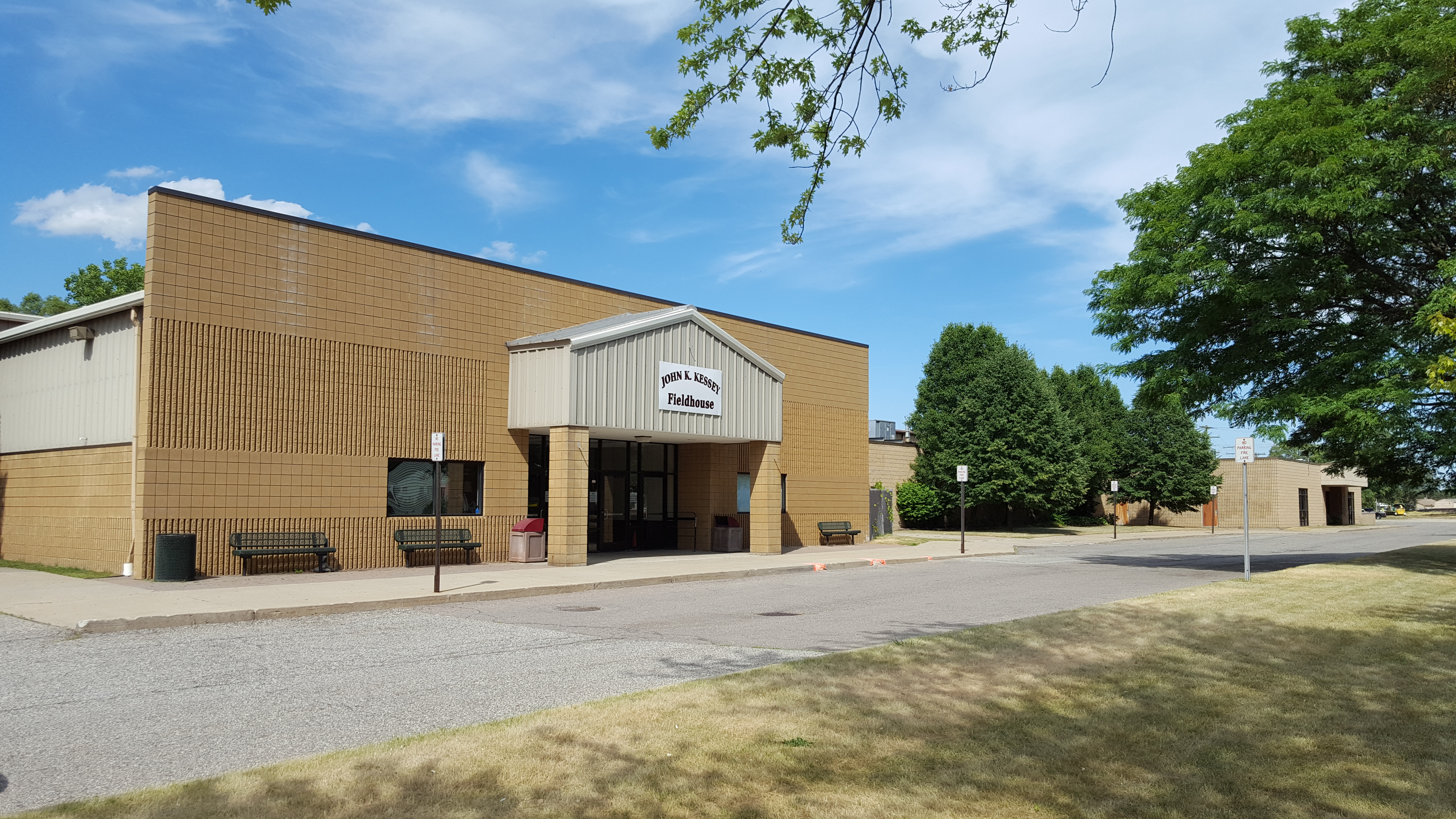
Melvindale Civic Center and John J. Kessey Fieldhouse

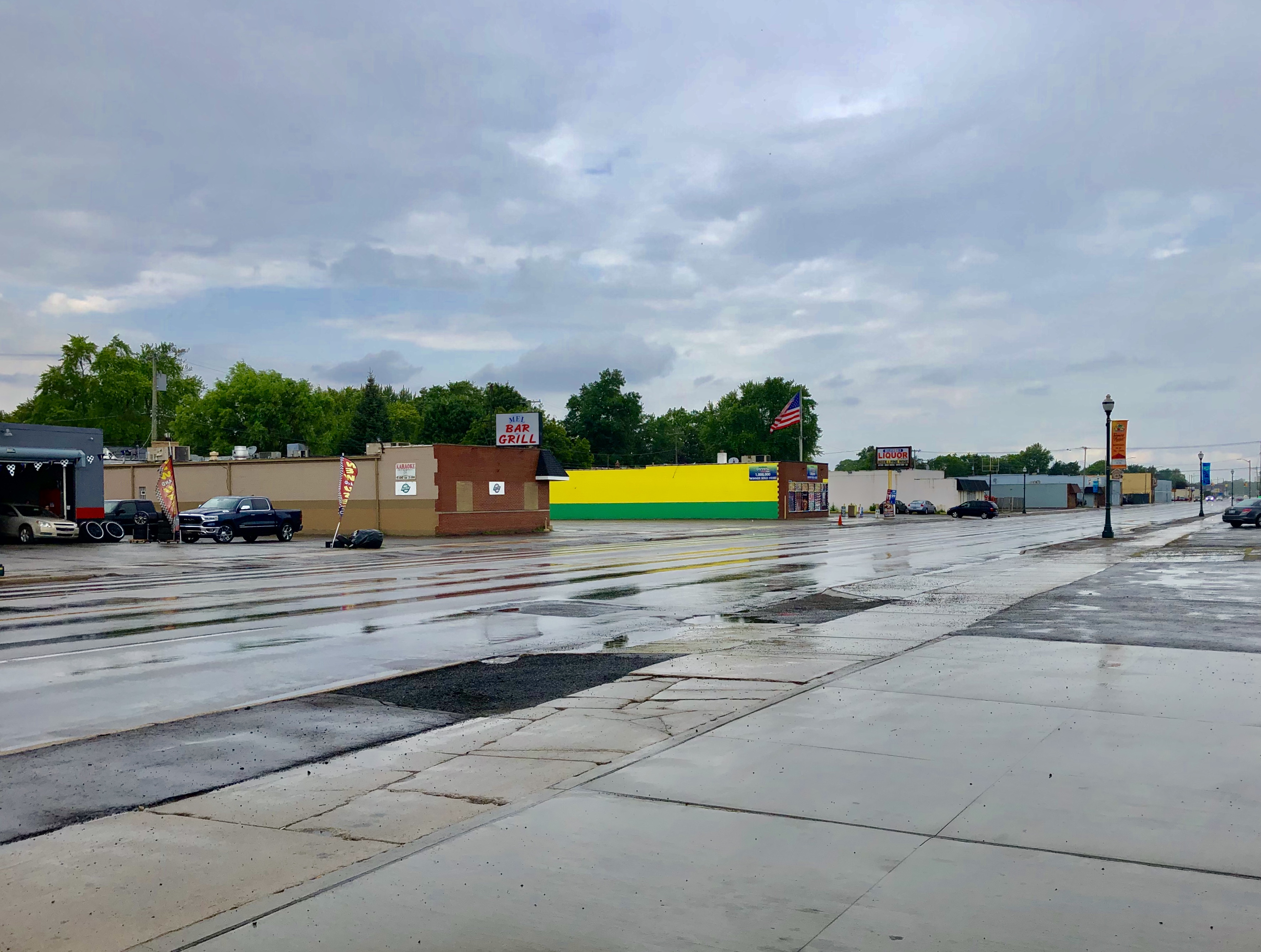
Shops on Allen Road
