= First Baptist Christian School (Elyria, Ohio) =

Location
- 11400 Lagrange Road; Elyria, (Lorain County), Ohio 44035; United States; 41°19′19″N 82°7′8″W

Information
- Type: Private, Coeducational high school
- Religious affiliation: Baptists
- Established: 1976
- Superintendent: Jeremy Peck
- NCES School ID: 01064482
- Chairperson: Kevin Quick
- Principal: Jenny Kime
- Faculty: 16.1 (on an FTE basis)
- Grades: PK–12
- Enrollment: 190 (2023–24)
- Student to teacher ratio: 11.1
- Campus size: 34 acres (140,000 m^{2})
- Colors: Red and White
- Team name: Sabres
- Website: www.fbcs-elyria.org

First Baptist Christian School is a private Christian school serving children from preschool through 12th grade in Elyria, Ohio. The school was founded in 1976.
