= Franklin Road Christian School (Tennessee) =

Christian school in Murfreesboro, Tn

Location
- Murfreesboro, Tennessee; 35.84627°N 86.4551537°W

Information
- Type: Christian
- Religious affiliation: Baptist
- Patron saint: Franklin Road Baptist Church
- Founded: 1974
- President: Joel Norris
- Head of school: Nate Reed
- Years offered: PreK - 12
- Enrollment: 602 (2024)
- Average class size: 50
- Campus type: Suburban
- Colors: Black and Gold
- Fight song: Country Roads Take Me Home (Unofficial)
- Athletics conference: TAACS, TSIAA
- Nickname: Minutemen
- Rival: South Haven Christian School
- Accreditation: AACS, TACS, COGINA
- Yearbook: Legacy
- Annual tuition: $5,600
- Website: frcsminutemen.com
- Last updated: January 5, 2018

Franklin Road Christian School (FRCS) is a private, co-educational K–12 Christian school in Murfreesboro, Tennessee, located on Highway 96 ("Franklin Road"). This school is known for conservative, Christian-based education. It is a ministry of Franklin Road Baptist Church. It is a school.

== Operations ==
The school is headed by the pastor of Franklin Road Baptist Church (currently Joel Norris), who holds the title president of the school. The day-to-day operations are handled by an administrator. The school's board is the board of deacons of FRBC.

== Athletics ==
FRCS is a member of the TAACS and TSIAA. Its teams include but are not limited to Soft Ball, Baseball, Soccer, Basketball, Cross Country, and Golf. The school has varsity and middle school boys' and girls' teams. Jimmy Olsen is the Athletic Director and Nate Reed his assistant. In 2026, the middle school baseball team won the TSIAA state tournament against Clarksville Christian School.
