= Infant baptism =

Christian baptism of infants or young children

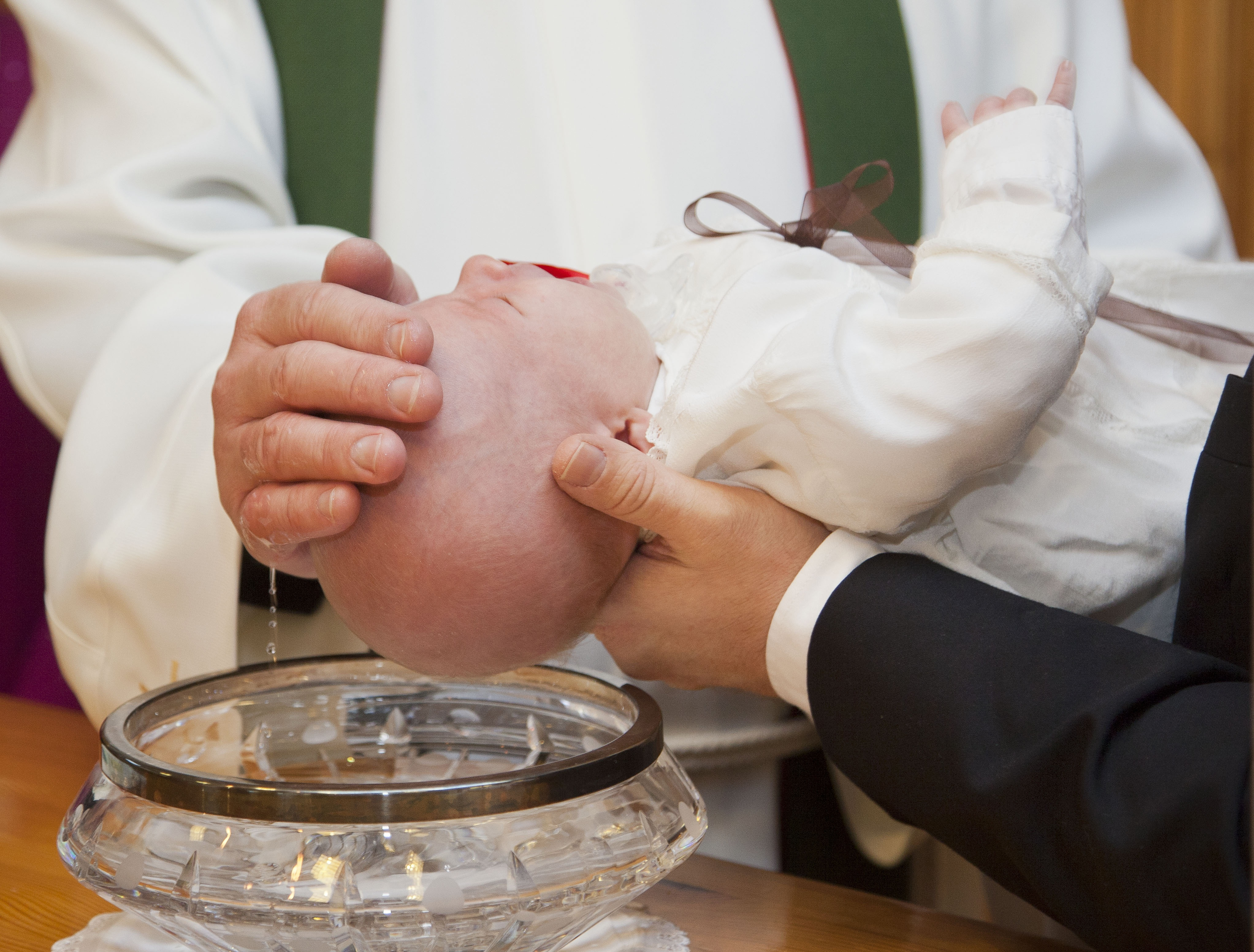
Infant baptism by a Lutheran pastor

Infant baptism (Note: also known as christening or pedobaptism) is a Christian sacramental practice of baptizing infants and young children. Such practice is done in the Catholic Church, the Eastern Orthodox and Oriental Orthodox churches, various Protestant denominations, and also in other denominations of Christianity. The practice involves baptizing infants born to believing parents as a means of initiating them into the Christian faith. Supporters of infant baptisms' biblical interpretations are that households were baptized in the New Testament and that Jesus welcomed children.

In contrast, believer's baptism (credobaptism) is based on the premise that baptism should be administered only to individuals who can individually profess faith. Those who support this view argue that baptism is a conscious act of commitment to Christianity, requiring an understanding of its significance. As a result, they maintain that only those capable of articulating their belief should participate in the sacrament. This perspective is commonly held by low church groups such as Anabaptists, Baptists, Pentecostals, and other evangelical groups. Proponents of believers’ baptism argue that there are no explicit references to infant baptism in the New Testament, along with the significance of baptism as a personal commitment.

== Age ==
Infant baptism practices vary across Christian denominations, typically occurring within the first few weeks after birth, though some traditions perform it immediately, such as in cases of imminent death, or delay it by several months.

- In the Roman Catholic tradition, baptism is recommended within the first few weeks, or without delay if the infant is in danger of death, as outlined in the Code of Canon Law (867 §1-§2), with parents responsible for arranging the sacrament.
- The Eastern Orthodox Church baptizes infants soon after birth, granting full sacramental participation, including Communion, to affirm their spiritual dignity and incorporation into the church.
- Lutheran churches view baptism as a sacrament of grace that forgives original sin, citing God's initiative and rejecting the concept of an "age of accountability," typically performing it without delay.
- In the Anglican tradition, baptism, or christening, has no age restriction and signifies inclusion in the covenant community, with parents pledging to raise the child in faith until personal confirmation.
- The Reformed tradition, grounded in covenant theology where baptism replaces circumcision, usually administers the sacrament within the first week, as noted in the Westminster Confession.
- Methodists practice baptism at any age, and for infants, it represents prevenient grace, with the congregation and parents committing to the child's spiritual upbringing.

== Ceremony ==
The exact details of the baptismal ceremony vary among Christian denominations. Many follow a prepared ceremony, called a rite or liturgy.

=== Reception ===
All traditions begin with the reception or presentation of candidates. In the Roman Catholic Rite of Baptism for Several Children, this includes the Reception of the Children and a Liturgy of the Word with Scripture readings, homily, and intercessions. Similarly, Episcopal and Lutheran rites open with the Presentation and Examination of Candidates, including questions to parents, sponsors, or godparents. This phase highlights communal recognition and prepares candidates (and their families) for baptism. In the Eastern Orthodox Church, the rite opens with the "reception of the catechumens," where the celebrant prays for the candidate to become "a reason-endowed sheep in the holy flock of your Christ, an honorable member of your Church, a child of the light, and an heir of your Kingdom."

=== Prayer and anointment ===
Prayers and symbolic anointings mark spiritual preparation. The Roman Catholic rite includes a Prayer of Exorcism and Anointing before Baptism, emphasizing purification. Episcopal and Lutheran traditions incorporate Prayers for the Candidates and, in Lutheranism, a Prayer of the Church invoking the Holy Spirit. While explicit anointing is more prominent in Catholicism (e.g., post-baptismal chrismation), all rites emphasize prayer as a means of spiritual strengthening. In the Eastern Orthodox rite, multiple exorcisms are performed, and prayers are made for the water to be "the water of redemption, the water of sanctification, the purification of flesh and spirit, the loosing of bonds, the remission of sins, the illumination of the soul, the laver of regeneration, the renewal of the spirit, the gift of adoption to sonship, the garment of incorruption, the fountain of life."

=== Blessing of water and baptism ===
The blessing of water and baptism proper are central to all rites. Roman Catholics perform a Blessing and Invocation of God over Baptismal Water, while Episcopalians and Lutherans include a Thanksgiving over the Water. Baptism itself is administered using the Trinitarian formula: Catholics, Episcopalians, and Lutherans all employ immersion or pouring "in the name of the Father, and of the Son, and of the Holy Spirit." In the Eastern Orthodox Church, the celebrant prays for the water to be sanctified with "the power (energeia) of the Holy Spirit," and the baptism is performed by triple immersion, immediately followed by Chrismation (anointing with holy oil).

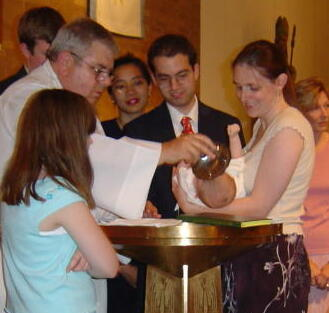
A priest pours water on the head of an infant held over the baptismal font in a Catholic church (United States) "The Rite of Baptism for Children" ceremony

=== Explanatory rites and seal of the spirit ===
Post-baptismal rituals symbolize the candidate’s new identity. Roman Catholics include Explanatory Rites: anointing with chrism (Seal of the Spirit), clothing in a white garment, presentation of a lighted candle, and the Ephphetha prayer. Episcopalians offer a Prayer for the Sevenfold Gift of the Holy Spirit, while Lutherans seal the candidate with a Prayer of the Church and present a baptismal candle. Eastern Orthodox Christians, after baptism, immediately chrismate the newly baptized, praying that the newly illumined will "please you in every deed and word, and may be a child and heir of your heavenly kingdom," affirming a twofold transformation: normative membership in the Church and acquisition of the "regenerate states" (purification, sanctification, illumination, regeneration). These rites signify the Holy Spirit's indwelling and the community's welcome.

=== Conclusion ===
While baptism itself does not always include Eucharist, its communal context often ties to Eucharistic worship. For example: Roman Catholics conclude with the Lord’s Prayer and a blessing, linking baptism to the broader liturgical life of the Church. Lutherans use a Baptismal Welcome, where the congregation affirms the newly baptized, often within a Eucharistic service. Episcopalians integrate baptism into the Baptismal Covenant, aligning it with congregational vows that precede shared Eucharist. In the Eastern Orthodox Church, baptism, chrismation, and first communion are typically administered together, even to infants, as baptism is seen as full incorporation into the Church's life, granting immediate access to the sacraments. Though not explicitly part of the baptismal rubric in all traditions, baptism is understood as initiation into a Eucharistic community.

== Historical development ==
=== First century ===
First-century Christian baptism primarily involved adult believers, with no definitive New Testament evidence for infant baptism, though some suggest household baptisms may have included infants. Scholarly consensus holds that infant baptism emerged gradually from the late 2nd century, became widespread by the 3rd century, and was universal by the 4th-5th centuries, coexisting with believers' baptism (Acts of the Apostles 2:38–41) amid early debates.

Historian David F. Wright (2007,2005), suggests that first-century Pauline churches did not practice infant baptism. Wright describes the issue as "obscurity unresolved," noting that evidence suggests children of baptized Christians were typically not baptized until at least c. 55 AD, during Paul's ministry, though the extent of this practice remains unclear.

Despite this, some theologians argue for the early presence of infant baptism. Joachim Jeremias (2004) and William A. Strange (1996) argue that infant baptism originated in the Apostolic Age, asserting that children of converts were baptized alongside their families. Advocates cite households baptisms within Acts of the Apostles (16:15, 33) and 1 Corinthians 1:16 as potential evidence. However, the Global Dictionary of Theology (2009) acknowledges the ambiguity of these accounts, stating that while infants may have been included, the texts do not provide explicit confirmation. Jeremias argues that baptism extended to all household members because the Old Testament concept of “household” is inherently inclusive, drawing upon interpretations of 1 Samuel 22:16–19 and Genesis 17:23. Therefore, the term "house" (oikos) has been central to this debate.

Steven Nicoletti (2015), proposes that the New Testament’s silence on infant baptism may affirm its practice, drawing on the concept of “presupposition pools”—shared assumptions of the time. They argue that early Christian texts likely omitted explicit mention of infant baptism because it was widely accepted, mirroring cultural norms where infants were naturally included in religious rites.

Another line of reasoning explores parallels with Jewish traditions. The analogy between circumcision and baptism is a key argument for early infant baptism. In Jewish tradition, boys were circumcised on the eighth day, and some scholars suggest early Jewish Christians viewed baptism similarly. Additionally, Jewish proselyte baptism included entire households, including children, as a purification rite for Gentile converts to Judaism. Theologian Kurt Aland (2004) counters that this was not standard for Jewish-born children, who were typically incorporated via circumcision, not baptism, weakening the parallel to Christian practice.

Further insight comes from early Christian texts addressing the sinfulness of infants or young children. Clement of Rome (1 Clement 14.4) stated, "No one is clean from defilement, not even if his life be but one day old." Although later used out of context, this became a proof-text for baptism addressing original sin. This view aligns with Psalm 51:5, which states, "Behold, I was brought forth in iniquity, and in sin did my mother conceive me," supporting the early Christian belief in humanity’s inherent sinfulness from birth. Similarly, the Didache, a church order dated to the late 1st or early 2nd century, provides instructions for adult baptism but notes that children should receive teaching to prevent future sin, without explicitly addressing their baptism. Early 1st-century Christian texts, like 1 Clement and Psalm 51:5, highlight universal sinfulness, linking baptism to sin’s remission and laying groundwork for the doctrine of original sin, later justifying infant baptism. Yet, direct evidence for the practice in this period is absent, leaving its prevalence uncertain.

=== Second century ===
Most of second-century Christian texts provide no explicit evidence for the practice of infant baptism. However, scholars like Wright and Aland identify literary traces emerging by the late second century. For example, the first clear reference to infant baptism comes from Tertullian, who opposed it or advocated for its delay. In On Baptism (c. 200 AD), he acknowledges it as an established custom but argues against it, suggesting that baptism should be delayed until individuals can personally profess faith. Strange (1996) observed that Tertullian’s opposition to infant baptism marked a departure from prevailing practice, arguing that patristic evidence suggests it was already a recognized norm. Additionally, Nuh Yilmaz (2020) notes that Tertullian's view did not resonate effectively in North African churches, where infant baptism continued as the general practice. North Africa remained the region with the strongest support for infant baptism, and according to Ferguson (1999) it may well have been where the practice originated.

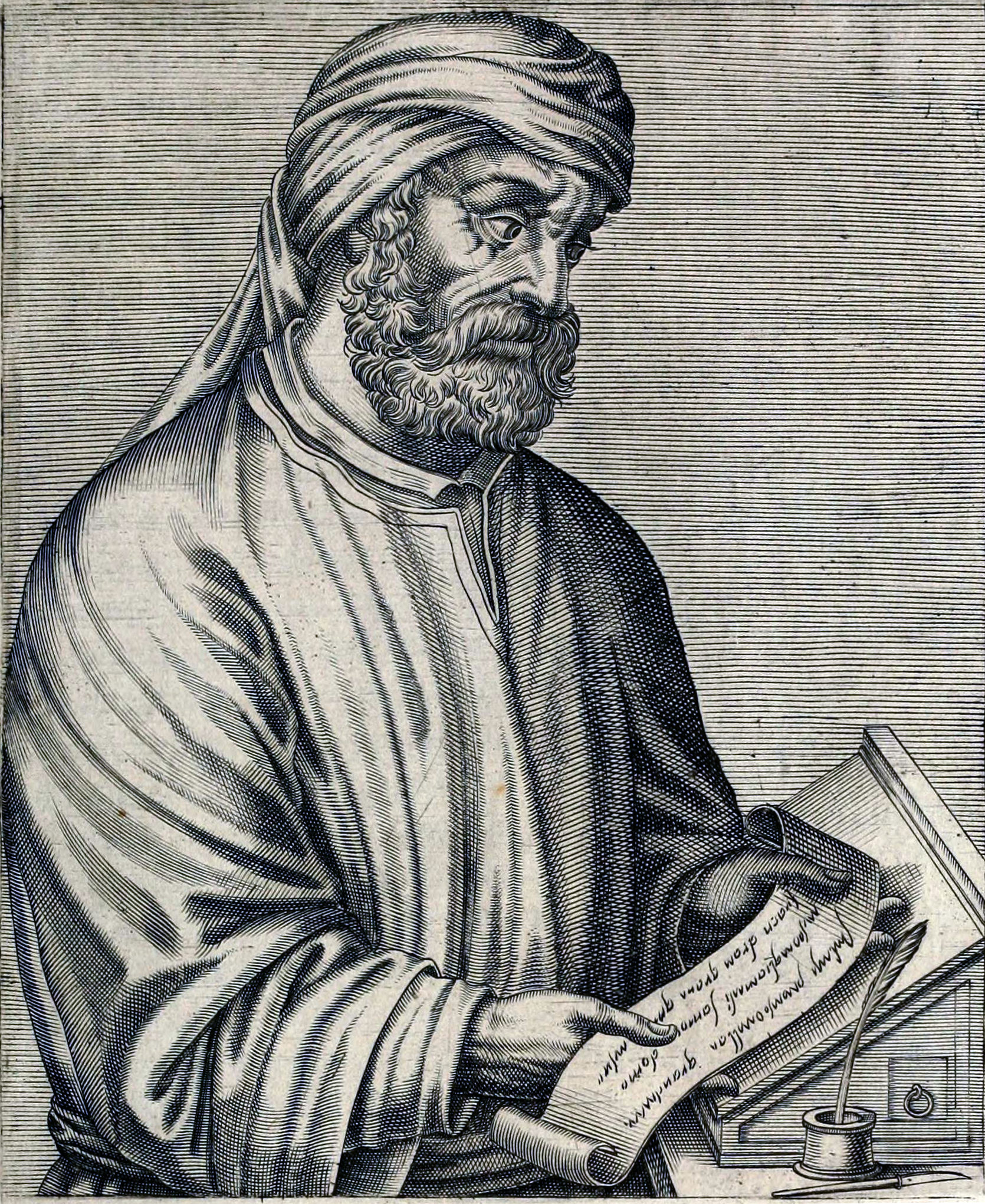
Tertullian (c. 160–220 AD) opposed infant baptism in his writings, provides the first clear evidence of its practice in early North African Christianity

Additionally, some advocates cite Irenaeus of Lyon who wrote that "infants, small children, youngsters, youths, and old folk" are "born again". Scholars such as Odd Magne Bakke (2005) and David P. Nelson (1996) interpret this as a reference to baptism, though Bakke qualifies that "reborn" (renascuntur) must be understood as a technical term for baptism. Conversely, Peter Jenson (2012) and Robert L. Meyers (1988) argue that the statement lacks specificity regarding infants.

Regardless, Christianity was growing in popularity and expansion during this period, structured catechesis became essential to prepare converts for faith amid persecution and heresies. This formalized approach to baptism, emphasizing instruction, according to Nelson (1996) likely reduced the practice of infant baptism, which required no prior preparation.

Insights into early Christian apologists viewed infants and young children as sinless or morally innocent. Notable examples include:The Shepherd of Hermas (c. 100–150 AD) which portrays children as models of discipleship and moral purity, inherently innocent and free of evil, serving as an example for believers. Aristides of Athens (Apology, Chapter 15, c. 125 AD) wrote that Christian children are born sinless and, if they die in infancy, are celebrated for passing from life without sin: “And when a child is born to one of them, the Christians give thanks to God; and if the child dies in infancy, they give thanks even more, for it has passed from this life sinless.” Athenagoras of Athens (On the Resurrection of the Dead, c. 177 AD): stated that infants who die are not judged, as they "have done neither evil nor good." Justin Martyr (First Apology, 15, c. 155 AD; Second Apology, 10, c. 153 AD) described infants and children as morally neutral, sinless until they can rationally choose to sin, emphasizing free will and the "seed of the Logos." He praised the purity of "disciples from childhood," suggesting no innate sinfulness.

=== Third century ===
Clearer evidence of infant baptism emerges in the third century. Yet from the third to the early fifth century, many Christian parents postponed baptizing their children. This delay was due to several factors: (1) the belief that waiting maximized baptism's spiritual benefits, (2) the custom of performing baptism only when death was near, (3) and the reluctance of unbaptized parents to have their children baptized.

Despite this, inscriptions such as from Rome’s Catacomb of Priscilla mentions an infant who had received baptism before dying. Such inscriptions suggest that infant baptism was practiced regularly, especially in cases of illness or impending death (Emergency baptism). Scholars like Jeremias and Ferguson examined inscriptional evidence related to infant baptism, Aland argued that third-century inscriptions offered no significant new information. By that period, infant baptism was already well attested in existing literary sources.

These existing literary sources included: Hippolytus of Rome (Apostolic Tradition 21.3-5) directed: “The little children shall be baptized first. If they can speak for themselves, let them do so; otherwise, their parents or a relative should answer on their behalf.” Origen claimed that infant baptism was an apostolic tradition passed down to the Church, though it remains uncertain whether his view stemmed from theological reasoning or scriptural exegesis. Regardless, his writings attests that the custom was already firmly rooted. Cyprian of Carthage further insisted that baptism should not be postponed, even for infants, asserting that God’s grace is "not given in greater or lesser measure based on the recipient’s age."

=== Fourth century ===
The fourth century marked a turning point for Christianity as it transitioned from persecution to a favored religion within the Roman Empire. This shift brought about divergent baptismal practices. In some areas, the longstanding catechumenate persisted, with rigorous pre-baptismal instruction exemplified by figures like Cyril of Jerusalem and Gregory of Nyssa. Simultaneously, infant baptism gained prominence, fueled by evolving theological understandings of original sin's implications.

During this period, the Church strongly condemned Pelagianism, which questioned the necessity of baptism for salvation, and affirmed that baptism must be administered without delay. For example, official decrees such as the Council of Florence’s Pro Jacobitis warned against postponing baptism, thereby underlining that infants (and others) must receive baptism promptly to secure salvation. These developments, along with texts from the Council of Carthage and the Roman Catechism that taught unbaptized infants could not attain heaven, demonstrate that by the end of the fourth century infant baptism was a widely accepted and normative practice in the Church.

Several prominent Christian leaders, such as Tertullian, Rufinus, Gregory of Nazianzus, Basil of Caesarea, Ambrose, Jerome, Augustine, and Cyril of Alexandria, attest to the widespread practice of infant dedication or enrollment in the catechumenate rather than immediate baptism. This custom was observed across major Christian centers, from Carthage and Milan to Constantinople and Alexandria. Consequently, in the fourth century, dedicating infants and later instructing them in the catechumenate remained the normative practice, while infant baptism was generally administered only in cases of urgent necessity (emergency baptism).

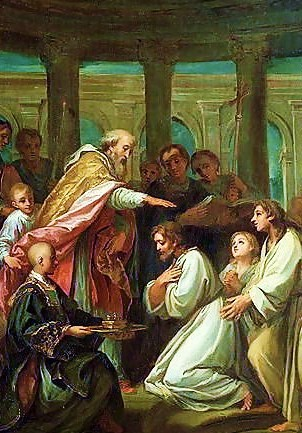
St. Augustine of Hippo being baptized in 387 AD

According to Andrew Messmer (2022), many prominent Christian leaders, though born into Christian families, were not baptized as infants but received it later in life. For instance, Novatian (200–258) was only baptized during a grave illness, while Gregory of Nazianzus (c. 329–390) waited until around age thirty. Basil of Caesarea was baptized at approximately 27 (c. 357), and Gregory of Nyssa between ages 23 and 28. Ambrose of Milan (340–397) remained unbaptized until his sudden election as bishop in 374, and John Chrysostom (347–407) was baptized around age 20 (c. 368). Jerome (347–420) received baptism at 19 (366), and Augustine (354–430), despite his devout mother Monica’s influence, delayed his baptism until age 33 (387). This pattern reflects the widespread practice of delaying baptism, even among those raised in Christian households.

Regarding their views, the early Church Fathers held divergent views on infant baptism, reflecting the theological tensions of their era. Augustine of Hippo, in his anti-Pelagian writings, maintained that baptism was essential for cleansing original sin, asserting that only through this sacrament could infants be incorporated into Christ's flock. He issued grave warnings about the eternal consequences of dying unbaptized. In contrast, Gregory of Nazianzus adopted a more moderate position, arguing that since infants lack awareness of sin or grace, baptism should be deferred unless imminent danger threatened their lives - suggesting age three as an appropriate minimum or when children could actively participate in the rite. Jerome took a decidedly proactive stance, particularly in his correspondence with Laeta (403 AD), where he framed infant baptism as a fundamental parental obligation, implying negligence in those who delayed the sacrament. These differing perspectives illustrate the evolving theology surrounding baptismal practices in early Christianity.

According to Robin M. Jensen (2012), archaeological evidence supports the existence of diverse baptismal practices in early Christianity. The variation in baptismal font designs suggests differences in liturgical customs, while third- and fourth-century funerary inscriptions confirm that some infants received emergency baptisms - though these do not demonstrate it was a widespread norm. The interpretation of iconographic evidence remains contested, as depictions of small figures undergoing baptism could represent either the baptism of Jesus or early instances of infant baptism. This ambiguity in material evidence mirrors the theological diversity seen in textual sources from the period.

=== Fifth century ===
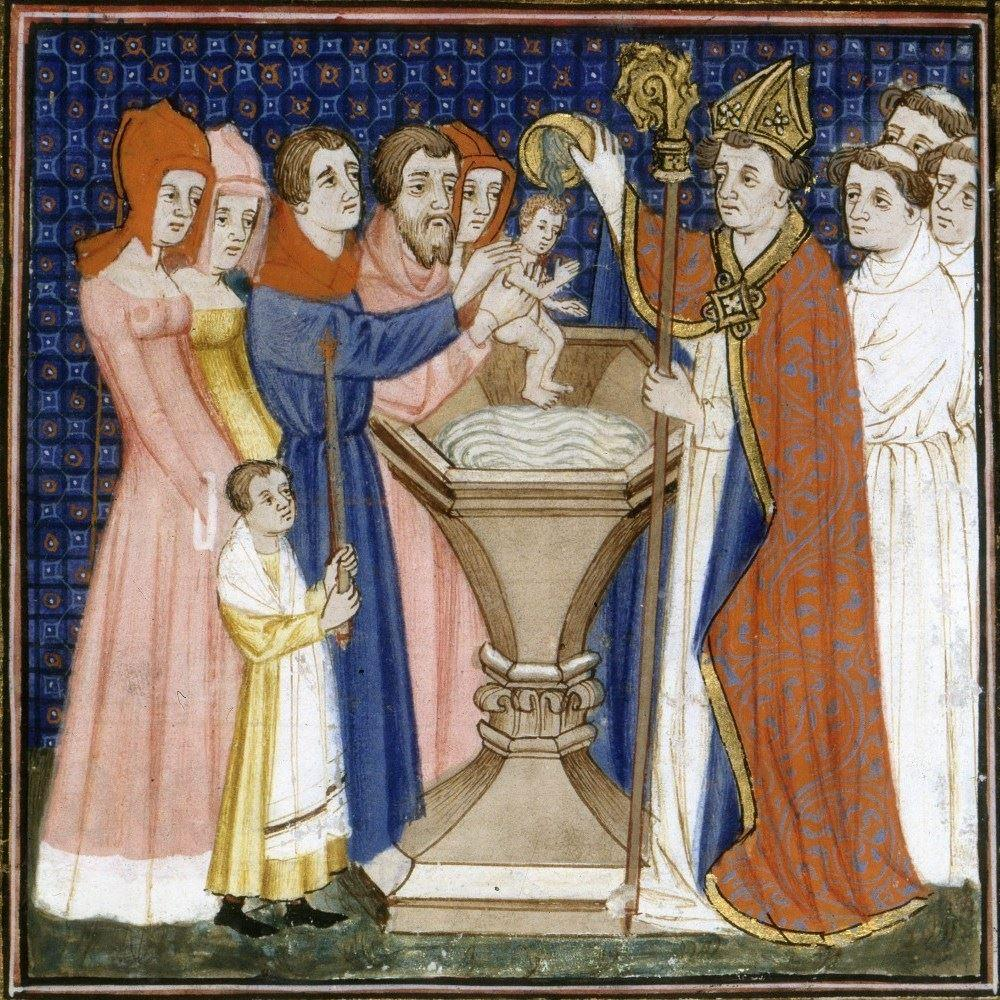
Medieval era miniature of an infant being baptized in a Baptismal font

By the late fifth century, theological debates increasingly emphasized original sin as the primary justification for infant baptism. The growing influence of Augustinian theology in Western Christianity found formal expression when the Council of Carthage (418 AD) affirmed that infants, while personally guiltless, bore the taint of Adam's original sin and consequently needed baptism for spiritual purification. This doctrinal development marked a significant shift in sacramental theology, transforming infant baptism from a discretionary practice to a theological necessity in Western Christian thought.

By the early sixth century, a growing emphasis on the doctrine of repeatable penance further heightened fears that unbaptized infants would suffer eternal damnation. This period saw a shift in practice: parents began engaging in formal baptismal preparation activities on behalf of their children. Over time, these preparations gave way to a consolidated ceremony, where newborn infants were baptised, anointed (confirmation), and received communion all at once to ensure that even the youngest members of the community were promptly incorporated into the salvific rite. Writings from such as John the Deacon’s letter (c. 500 AD) highlight that the Church’s teaching and practice had firmly established infant baptism as essential for salvation in response to original sin. Large fonts from this period indicate that adult baptism continued alongside infant baptism well into the sixth and seventh centuries. In the sixth century, 526 AD, eastern Roman emperor, Justinian I made infant baptism compulsory.

=== Middle ages ===
The practice of infant baptism expanded significantly during the early Middle Ages, particularly from the sixth century onward, largely due to concerns about high infant mortality rates. This led to the frequent administration of emergency baptisms (baptism in extremis), often performed in respite sanctuaries. The sacrament became firmly established as a normative practice through the Carolingian reforms of the ninth century, and was further consolidated during the Gregorian reforms of the eleventh and twelfth centuries.

== Denominational teachings and practices ==
=== Roman Catholic ===
The Catholic Church requires a "founded hope" the child will be raised Catholic for licit baptism (Code of Canon Law 868 §1, 2° CIC). If absent, baptism is postponed (not denied) with explanation. The sacrament grants regeneration, removes original sin, and unites the child with Christ. Therefore, baptism is a fundamental sacrament in the Church, marking the initiation of an individual into Christian life and the Church community. It is essential for salvation, providing spiritual rebirth and access to other sacraments.

The Church requires assurance that baptized infants will be raised Catholic (Canon 868 §1, 2° CIC). Parental consent is mandatory - at least one parent/guardian must approve. Baptism cannot be administered against parental wishes except in danger of death, when it may proceed regardless of objections. Additionally, baptism is seen as a one-time sacrament that marks a person's commitment to Christ and cannot be repeated. If there is serious doubt about whether someone was baptized before or if it was done correctly, the Catholic Church allows a conditional baptism to be performed. Moreover, the practice of baptizing miscarried or stillborn infants is no longer done.

The Church recognizes both pouring (affusion) and immersion as valid baptismal methods, stating that the symbolic cleansing is preserved through the ritual use of water, even when full immersion isn't practiced.

The Church acknowledges the importance of a personal decision in baptism, which infants cannot make. To address this, godparents are appointed to stand in for the child, committing to their Christian upbringing on behalf of the parents. The role of parents and godparents is strongly emphasized in the Church's rite of infant baptism, which was revised on the instructions of the Second Vatican Council. As they grow, baptized children are expected to embrace the faith chosen for them, confirming the decision made on their behalf.

Historically, such practices were developed gradually, rooted in early Christian tradition, original sin, and sacramental theology. While adult baptism was initially dominant, the practice of baptizing infants became common by the third century. Cyprian of Carthage (c. 250 AD) defended it, arguing that baptismal grace should not be denied to children. In the fourth century, Augustine of Hippo linked baptism to original sin, asserting that it was necessary for salvation. His arguments shaped medieval sacramental theology, which emphasized that baptism remained valid regardless of personal faith (ex opere operato). The concept of limbo (limbus infantium), a speculative idea that unbaptized infants neither enter heaven nor suffer in hell, was never official Church doctrine. Though widely held from the 12th century onward, belief in limbo had largely faded by the 20th century.

In response to Protestant critiques, the Council of Trent (1545–1563) firmly upheld infant baptism as obligatory, solidifying its standard practice with support from godparents and catechesis. Today, the Church teaches that unbaptized infants are entrusted to God’s mercy, while maintaining that baptism remains essential for initiation into the faith and liberation from original sin.

=== Eastern Churches ===
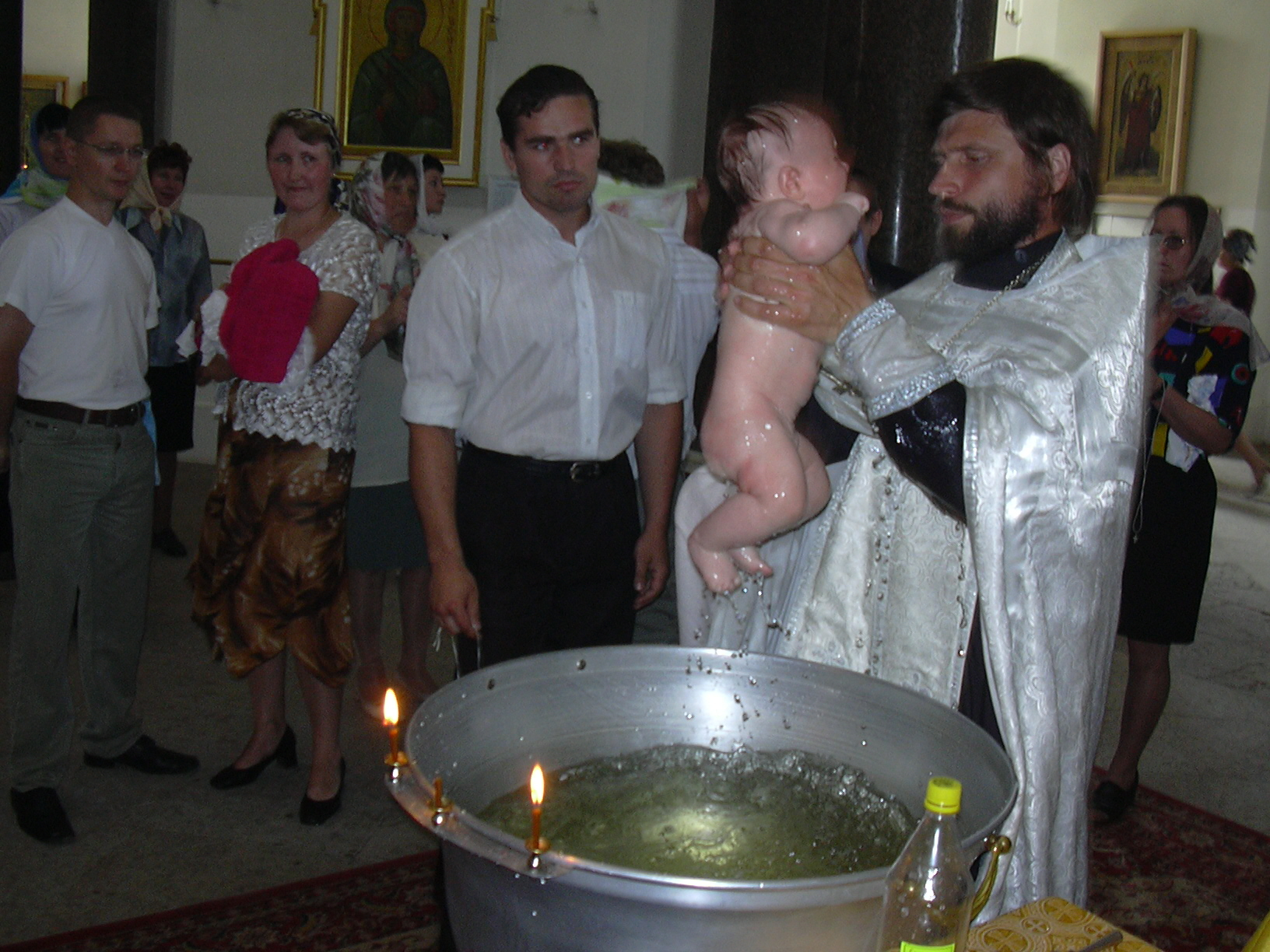
Baptism by immersion in the Eastern Orthodox Church (Sophia Cathedral, 2005)

The Eastern Orthodox Church practices infant baptism as a fundamental part of its sacramental theology, viewing it as the child's initiation into the Church and participation in the life of Jesus. The baptism is performed through triple immersion in water, symbolizing the believer’s sharing in Christ’s death and resurrection. In Orthodox theology, sacraments are considered effective by the very act of their completion (ex opere operato), meaning they impart divine grace regardless of the recipient’s personal understanding.

The Orthodox Church, like the Roman Catholic Church, believes that baptism results in the forgiveness of sins, both original and actual. Through baptism, the newly baptized is "clothed with Christ" and becomes a full member of the Church. The sacrament is viewed as a mystical communion with God, through which grace is given for salvation and spiritual transformation. This understanding reflects the Orthodox belief that sacraments are "Mysteries", divine means by which humanity experiences salvation and anticipates eternal life in God’s kingdom.

Baptism in the Orthodox Church is immediately followed by Chrismation (Confirmation) and Holy Communion, emphasizing the unity of these three sacraments. Chrismation, administered by the priest, involves anointing the baptized with Holy Myron (Chrism), sealing them with the gift of the Holy Spirit. The newly baptized, including infants, then receive the Eucharist, partaking in consecrated wine and bread as their first communion. This integrated approach contrasts with many Western Christian traditions, where these sacraments are administered separately at different stages of life.

The baptism of infants is performed on the basis of the faith of the Church, rather than the personal profession of the child. The commitment of parents and godparents plays a crucial role, as they pledge to raise the child in the Orthodox faith. While infants are traditionally baptized on the eighth day, mirroring the Old Testament practice of circumcision, this timing is not strictly required, and baptisms may occur at any time. Orthodox theology holds that baptism is essential for salvation and the remission of original sin, making it a vital sacrament in the life of every Orthodox Christian.

=== Protestant ===
==== Lutheran Churches ====
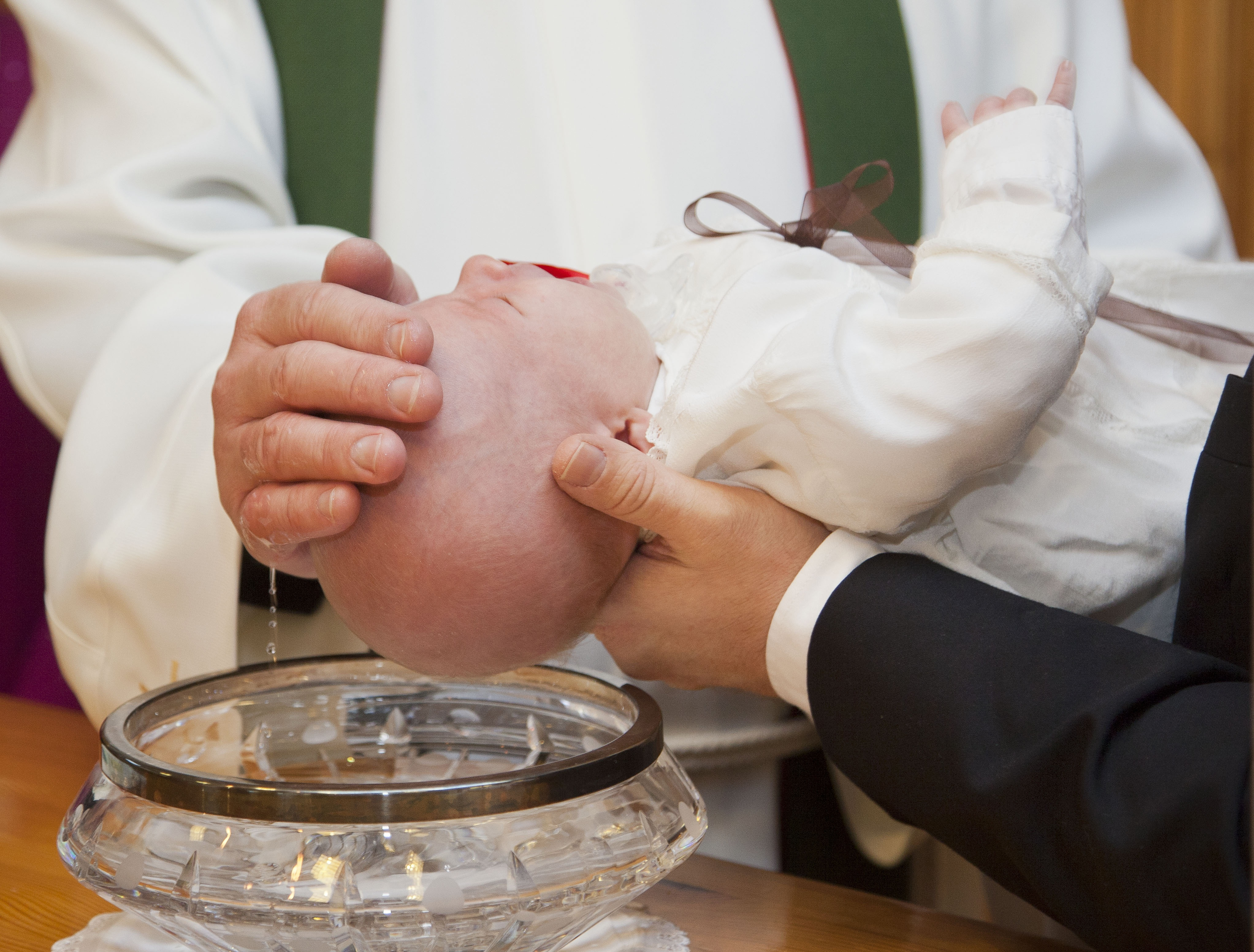
Baptism of a child in Finland by a Lutheran pastor (2015)

Lutherans uphold infant baptism by pointing to scriptural references where entire households were baptized (e.g., Acts 16:15). They argue that households in biblical times included children. According to Martin Luther, baptism is not founded on personal faith, as one can never be certain of faith. Instead, it is based on God's word and commandment. The faith involved is that of those who bring the child to baptism (fides aliena), such as parents, godparents, and the church congregation.

Lutherans believe that through baptism, the child receives infused faith, mediated by the prayers of the church, parents, and godparents. Baptism purifies and renews the child. Personal faith is not a prerequisite for baptism but is nourished by it, as the individual continually adheres to God's grace and renounces sin throughout life. The Augsburg Confession (II) states that baptism is necessary for salvation. It is an assignment to Christ, a surrender into Jesus’ death and resurrection, and a gift of new life that calls the baptized to walk in faith.

While baptism marks initiation into the church and incorporation into the people of God, it is viewed as the beginning of a lifelong journey. If not taken in faith, baptism remains incomplete. In the post-Reformation era, Lutheran orthodoxy reaffirmed the necessity of infant baptism. However, later movements such as Pietism and Rationalism emphasized inner experience over the sacrament, leading figures like John Wesley to argue that true rebirth occurs through personal transformation, not the outward ritual.

==== Methodist ====
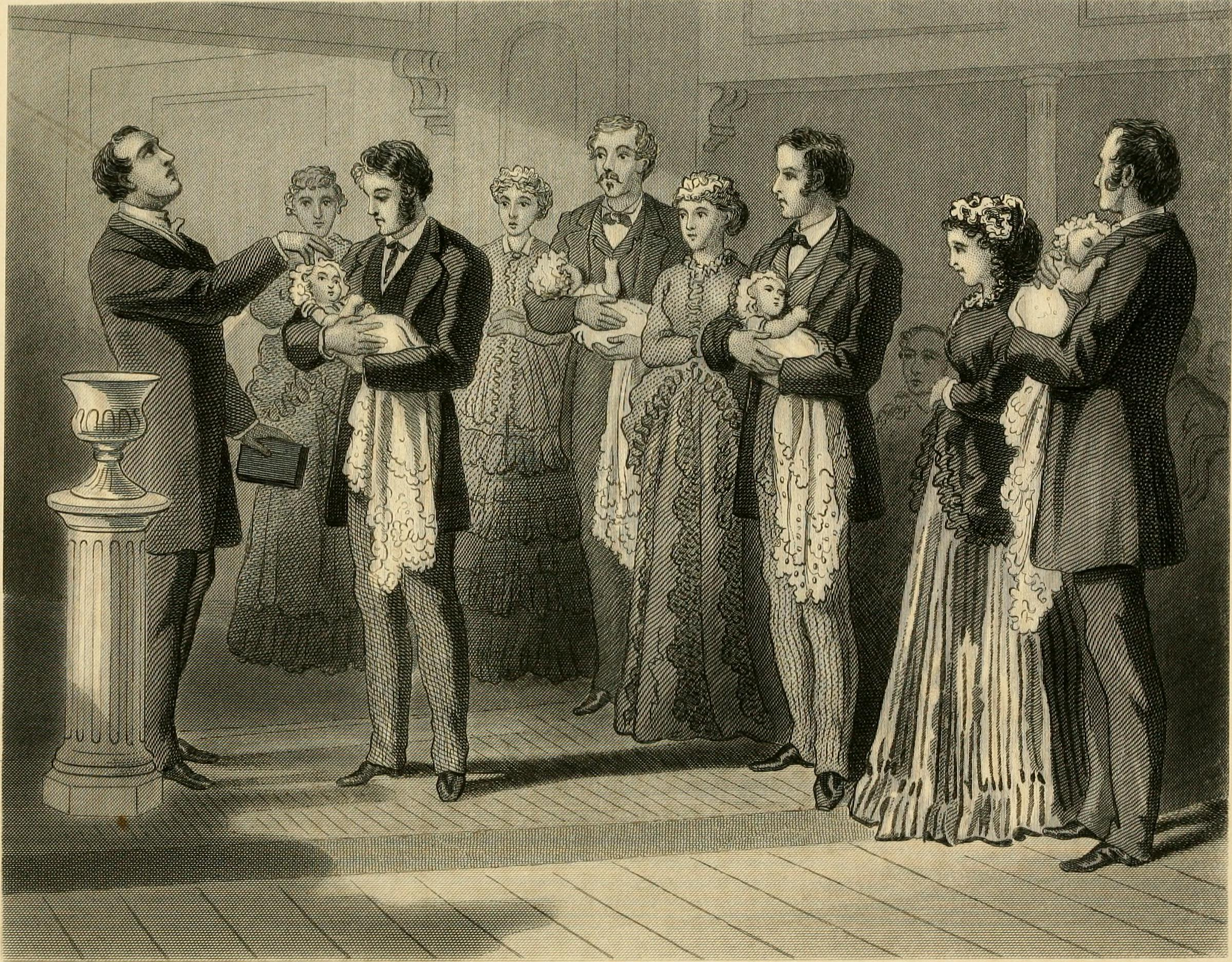
Presbyterian-Congregational Alliance (1770–1852)

According to Campbell (1999), Methodist churches affirm infant baptism, rooted in the seventeenth Article of Religion’s instruction to retain “the baptism of young children” (p. 107). Methodists have historically defended this practice against critics of infant baptism, grounding it in New Testament accounts of household baptisms (Acts 16:15, 33), Jesus’ embrace of children (e.g., Matthew 19:13–15), and the belief that all, including infants, require inclusion in the church’s covenantal fellowship. For Methodists, infant baptism signifies “an acceptance of the prevenient grace of God and as a confession on the part of the church of its responsibility for children in general and for every child in particular.” Methodist doctrine further emphasizes that justifying grace, essential for salvation, is received after repentance and a personal commitment to Christ as Savior. While many Methodist denominations, such as the Free Methodist Church and Allegheny Wesleyan Methodist Connection, practice infant baptism for families who request it, they also offer a rite of child dedication for those who prefer to delay baptism until their child can consciously profess faith.

==== Presbyterian, Congregational and Reformed Churches ====
Presbyterian, Congregational, and Reformed churches administer infant baptism based on covenant theology, viewing baptism as "a sign and seal of the covenant of grace" and the "visible Word of God" (Fesko 2010, p. 4). They argue that baptism replaces circumcision as the covenant sign and that just as infants were circumcised under the old covenant, so now infants should be baptized under the new covenant (p. 8). Baptism is not merely a human act of profession but is "God’s visible covenant promise when accompanied by the Word" and serves as a "means of grace" (p. 6). This perspective stresses that baptism is grounded in "God’s covenant dealings with His people," not in an individual’s decision or personal faith alone (p. 3).

== Confirmation ==
For Catholic and Wesleyan Methodist Christians, Confirmation "strengthens" (the original meaning of the word "confirm") the grace of Baptism, by conferring an increase and deepening of that grace.

In Eastern Christianity, including the Eastern Catholic Churches, the sacrament of Confirmation is conferred immediately after baptism, and there is no renewal of baptismal promises. In the Latin Church and its Latin liturgical rites of the Catholic Church, the sacrament is to be conferred at about the age of discretion (generally taken to be about 7), unless the Episcopal Conference has decided on a different age, or there is danger of death or, in the judgment of the minister, a grave reason suggests otherwise (canon 891 of the Code of Canon Law). The renewal of baptismal promises by those receiving the sacrament in the Western Catholic Church is incidental to the rite and not essentially different from the solemn renewal of their baptismal promises that is asked of all members of this church each year at the Easter Vigil service. Only in French-speaking countries has there been a development of ceremonies, quite distinct from the sacrament of Confirmation, for young Catholics to profess their faith publicly, in line with their age.

Within the Church of Jesus Christ of Latter-day Saints, confirmation or "the laying on of hands" is an essential part of the baptismal ordinance, and to receive baptism without confirmation is to leave the ordinance incomplete. Confirmation is the conferring of the gift of the Holy Ghost as a constant companion. To confirm means to "make more sure" and the ordinance of confirmation stands as a witness of the individual becoming a member of the LDS Church and not just an acceptance of Jesus.

== Comparison with believer's baptism ==
=== Definition of believer's baptism ===
Believer’s baptism emphasizes conscious faith and personal commitment as prerequisites. Advocates argue that household baptisms in Acts (e.g., Acts 16:15, 33) cited for infant baptism rely on an argument from silence, as no explicit biblical text mentions infant baptism. Historical records suggest infant baptism emerged in the late second century, lacking direct scriptural precedent. Rooted in Pauline theology (Romans 6:4; Galatians 3:27), baptism symbolizes the burial of the “old self” and resurrection to new life in Christ through immersion. Groups like the Adventists view it as a public declaration of repentance and surrender to Christ’s lordship. Swiss Reformer Huldrych Zwingli emphasized baptism as a memorial act, not a sacramental means of grace.

=== Key theological differences ===
Believer’s baptism prioritizes responsible baptism, requiring the baptized to become competent to know Christ. It is effective only when joined with faith and presupposes that baptized can respond for themselves to the baptismal interrogations and thus bear witness to personal faith. However, infant baptism primarily rests on God’s initiative, viewing baptism as a sign of grace and covenant membership, not requiring personal faith but depending on the church’s faith.

== Debates regarding infant baptism ==
The debate over infant baptism engages ecclesiology, covenant, and faith, often sparking controversy. Tom J. Nettles et al. (2007) in Understanding Four Views on Baptism highlight two irreconcilable traditions: believer’s baptism, emphasizing personal faith, and infant baptism, prioritizing covenantal continuity. These frameworks “simply cannot be mixed” without undermining theological integrity (p. 21)

=== Arguments for ===
Proponents of infant baptism base their position on a covenantal framework, equating the practice with the Old Testament rite of circumcision. In Reformed theology, baptism signifies a child’s inclusion in God’s covenant community and membership within the visible church, mirroring circumcision’s role in ancient Israel. B. B. Warfield noted this continuity, arguing that God’s inclusion of children in the covenant community, established during Abraham’s time, still grants them access to church membership and sacraments. Luther defended infant baptism as an act of obedience to Christ’s directive to bring children to God, grounding the practice in divine authority rather than human choice.

=== Arguments against ===
Critics of infant baptism maintain that the New Testament portrays baptism reserved for individuals who consciously respond to the gospel and profess faith, rather than as a covenantal rite applied to infants. They state that the absence of explicit biblical examples where baptism is administered to those incapable of understanding or articulating belief, therefore weakens its symbolic role in affirming Christian identity.

As for the historical viewpoint, critics argue that infant baptism originated as a post-apostolic ecclesiastical innovation, lacking direct biblical or apostolic authorization, and dismiss it as a human tradition unsupported by divine revelation.

Regarding consent, Mary McAleese, a Catholic legal scholar and former Irish president, posits in her doctoral research that infant baptism functions as “enforced membership” within the Catholic Church, raising questions about consent and lifelong obligations imposed on children. She suggests that baptized individuals should later have the opportunity to formally affirm or renounce their membership, aligning with modern principles of freedom of conscience, belief, and religion. McAleese observes that the Catholic Church has yet to fully integrate these principles into its sacramental theology.

==== Opposing denominations ====
These doctrinal positions shape baptismal practices across Christian traditions, exemplified by: Anabaptists (e.g., Mennonites, Amish), Baptist Traditions (Southern, Reformed), Churches of Christ, Pentecostal/Charismatic groups (Assemblies of God, Oneness Pentecostals). Additionally, several nontrinitarian Christians also oppose infant baptism, including Oneness Pentecostals, Christadelphians, Jehovah's Witnesses, United Church of God, and the Church of Jesus Christ of Latter-day Saints (LDS).

Specifically, the LDS Church has stated that little children are considered both born without sin and incapable of committing sin. They have no need of baptism until age eight, when they can begin to learn to discern right from wrong, and are thus accountable to God for their own actions. However, the LDS Church performs a non-saving ordinance to name and bless children, customarily performed on infants.

== Challenges and controversies ==
=== Injury and death ===
In October 2020, a Greek Orthodox priest in Cyprus was accused of harming an infant during a baptism near Limassol. Video evidence showed the priest forcefully immersing the crying baby into a metal font, causing the child's legs to repeatedly strike the container. The parents filed a complaint, alleging the priest ignored their requests for gentle handling and responded, “I am responsible for the baptism.” The mother, Ntina Shitta, reported the baby was “red and in shock” afterward, describing the event as a “ruined” milestone. The priest issued a public apology on October 19, denying intent to harm and claiming he acted to prevent the baby from slipping, expediting the ritual upon noticing distress. Church authorities launched an investigation, but no immediate charges or disciplinary actions were announced.

On February 5, 2021, a six-week-old baby died in Suceava, Romania, within a Romanian Orthodox Church, after a baptism involving triple immersion in holy water, led to cardiac arrest and liquid in the lungs. A manslaughter inquiry targeted the priest involved. Archbishop Calinic of Arges called for reviewing baptism practices, favoring alternatives like sprinkling, while the Archbishop of Tomis defended the traditional ritual, rejecting change. A petition for safer baptisms gained 60,000 signatures.

=== Catholic forced baptism and custody ===
==== Postremo mense ====
In 1747, Pope Benedict XIV issued papal bull Postremo mense, about baptizing Jewish children, building on old Church traditions. Benedict XIV said it is usually wrong to baptize a Jewish child without the parents' permission, but it is permissible if the child is dying. If a child is baptized, even improperly, the Church must take them from non-baptized Jewish parents to raise them as Christians. These ideas matched earlier thinkers like Thomas Aquinas and were supported by later figures like Alphonsus Liguori. The Church punished unauthorized baptisms, but the baptism's effects still stood. In 1751, Benedict issued a Probe te meminisse reinforcing these rules and setting penalties for Jewish converts who left Catholicism.

==== Edgardo Mortara case (1858) ====
In 1858, six-year-old Jewish boy Edgardo Mortara was removed from his family in Bologna, then part of the Papal States, after a Catholic servant had baptized him as an infant during an illness, citing concern for his spiritual salvation. Under papal law, which required Catholic children to be raised in the faith, authorities declined requests from Edgardo’s parents to return him, despite appeals to figures such as Cardinal Giuseppe Milesi Ferretti and Archbishop Michele Viale-Prèla. Efforts by the family and Jewish leaders to negotiate with officials were unsuccessful. Due to the emotional strain of the separation, Edgardo’s mother, Marianna, was temporarily relocated from the home. The Church assumed custody of Edgardo, prompting widespread international criticism.

==== Baptism during the Holocaust ====
During the Holocaust, many Jewish children in Nazi-occupied Poland were hidden and rescued by Catholic convents and monasteries. The motivations of the rescuers varied. While many nuns acted out of Christian compassion and humanitarian duty, the issue of religious conversion became controversial. Some children were baptized, sometimes as a protective measure, but this led to postwar disputes about their religious identity and custody. After the war, tensions arose between Jewish organizations and the Catholic Church over whether baptized children should be returned to the Jewish community or remain in Catholic care.

==== Finaly Affair ====
Jewish boys Robert and Gérald Finaly, hidden by Catholics during WWII, were baptized. Postwar, their Catholic caretaker refused to return them to Jewish relatives, citing their baptism. Legal battles ended with their return to Jewish family in 1953.

== Other religious traditions ==
=== Yazidism ===
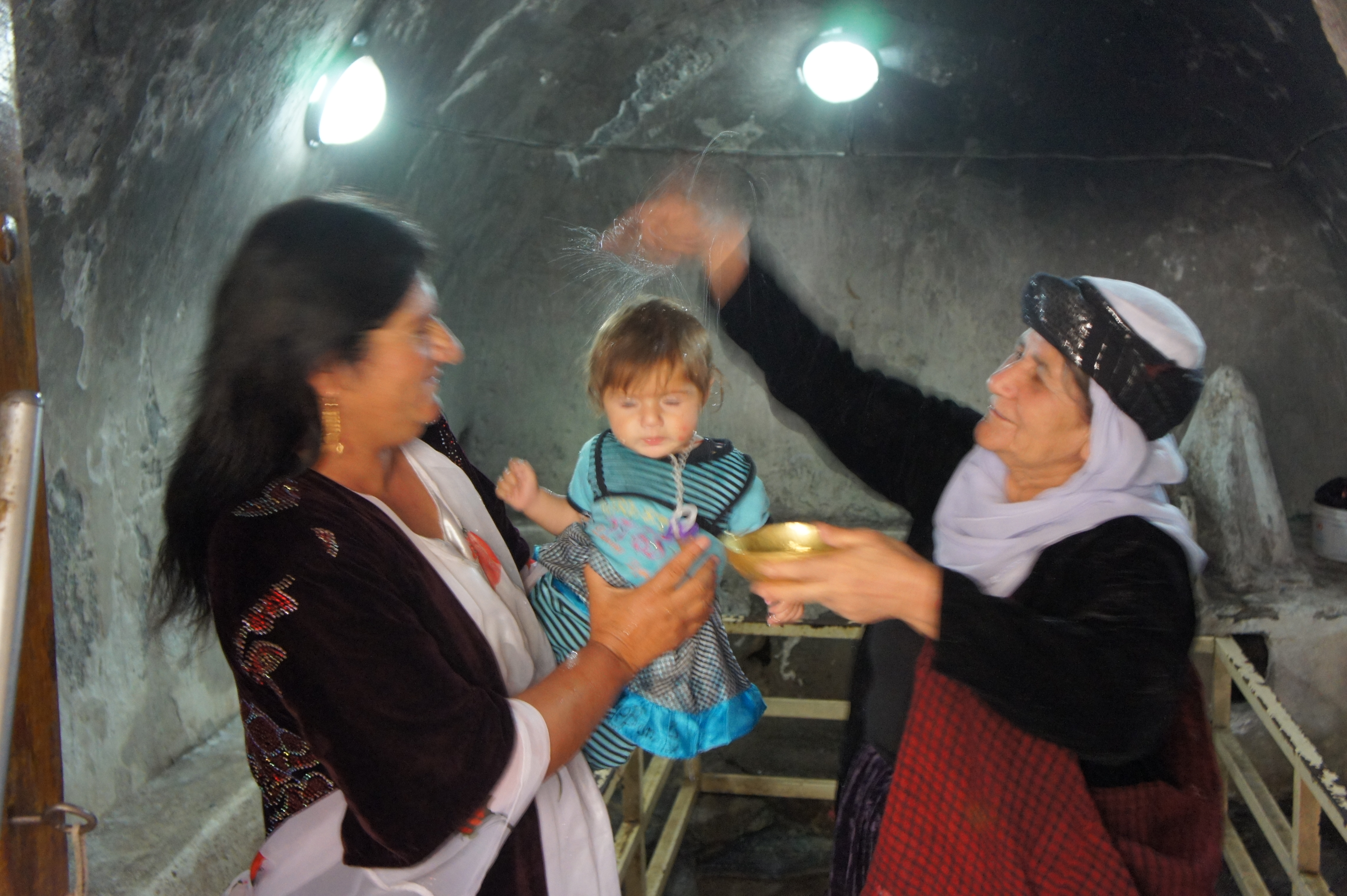
Baptism of a Yazidi child in Lalish

In Yazidism, Mor kirin ("to seal") is a baptism ritual typically performed at birth to initiate children into the faith. Holy water from the Kaniya Sipî (White Spring) at Lalish, the holiest Yazidi site. Alternatively, one may use the slightly less holy Zimzim spring.

Individuals originating from regions near Lalish frequently translate the mor kirin ceremony as 'baptism,' due to its observable similarities with Christian baptismal rites.

The rite is performed by either a male or female member of a shaikh or pir family who serves as the officiating Mijêwir (custodian) at Lalish, specifically holding the position of Micêwirê Kaniya Sipî (custodian of the White Spring) during the ceremony.

The officiant pours holy water from one of Lalish's sacred springs over the child's head in three ritual motions. While the ideal age for reception is nine or ten years, practical considerations often lead to earlier administration. Although circumcision is not a religious requirement, some families observe the practice due to regional customs.

According to Iraqi Yazidi tradition, individuals who die without undergoing mor kirin must be ritually washed by their shaikh, pir, or designated "Brother/Sister of the Hereafter" (Kurd. Birayê/Xuşka Axiretê). If none of these are available, another person may perform the washing in their name. For those unable to travel to Lalish, the rite may be conducted using holy water transported from the sacred springs of Lalish to their location.

However, adherence to this practice varies geographically. Yazidis originating from areas near Lalish observe the custom more consistently than those from Turkey or Armenia, among whom the ritual has largely diminished in perceived necessity.

While the mor kirin ceremony may reflect historical Christian influences, its origins remain speculative. Given the significance of water in pre-Islamic Iranian religions, the rite could equally stem from earlier indigenous traditions.

== See also ==
- Anabaptists
- Aqiqah
- Baptism
- Believer's baptism
- Sacraments of initiation
- Infant communion
- William Wall (theologian)

== Sources ==
- Aland, Kurt (2004). Did the Early Church Baptize Infants?. Wipf and Stock Publishers. ISBN 978-1-59244-541-7.
- Bakke, Odd Magne (2005). When Children Became People: The Birth of Childhood in Early Christianity. Fortress Press. ISBN 978-1-4514-1530-8.
