= Boylston Street =

Street in Greater Boston, Massachusetts

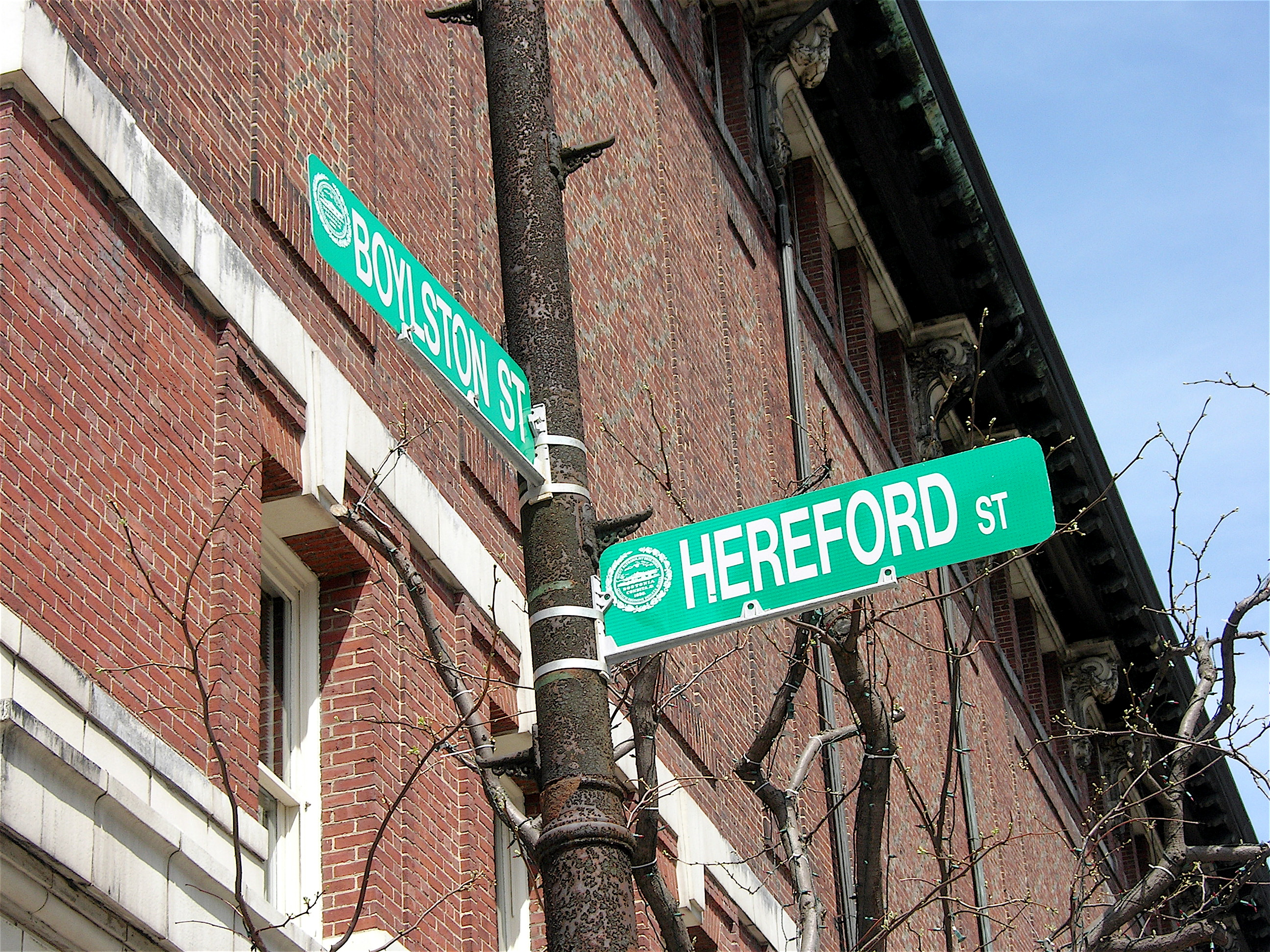
- Street signs at Boylston and Hereford Streets
- Location: Boston
- West end: Brookline Avenue
- Major junctions: I-90 (Massachusetts Turnpike)
- East end: Washington Street

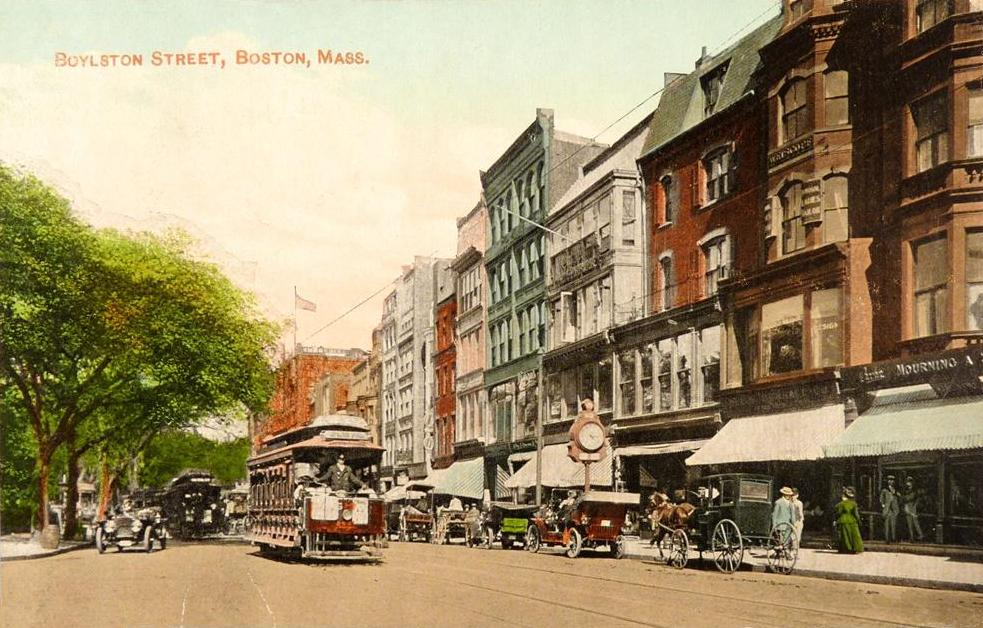
Boylston Street in 1911

Boylston Street is a major east–west thoroughfare in the city of Boston, Massachusetts, and its western suburbs. The street begins in Boston's Chinatown neighborhood, forms the southern border of the Boston Public Garden and Boston Common, runs through Back Bay and Boston's Fenway neighborhood, merges into Brookline Ave and then Washington Street, emerging again contiguous with Route 9 out to where it crosses Route 128, after which it becomes Worcester Street. It is iconic for the tragic Boston Marathon 2013 bombing, a bombing using two pressure cooker bombs at 671 and 755 Boylston Street and had killed three people and injured 264 others.

== Name ==
As early as 1722, Boylston Street, then a short road on the outskirts of the town of Boston, was known as Frogg Lane or Frog Lane. It was later renamed for Ward Nicholas Boylston (1747–1828), a philanthropist and benefactor of Harvard University. Boylston, who was a descendant of Zabdiel Boylston, was born in Boston and spent much of his life in it. Boylston Market, and the town of Boylston, Massachusetts, were also named for him.

== Route ==
From east to west, Boston's Boylston Street begins at the intersection of Essex Street and Washington Street in Boston's Chinatown neighborhood at the edge of Downtown Boston. It is a one-way street running west-to-east from Tremont Street to Washington Street. West of Tremont Street, it runs along the southern edge of the Boston Common and the Boston Public Garden. West of Arlington Street, it is a one-way street running eastbound, forming a major traffic artery and commercial street through the Back Bay neighborhood, where it passes along the north side of Copley Square. West of the Back Bay neighborhood, the street intersects with the Fenway to form the northern boundary of the Back Bay Fens. Here it intersects with the Charlesgate viaduct, connecting to Storrow Drive. West of this intersection, the street carries traffic in both directions as a two-way, six-lane street through Boston's Fenway neighborhood. It runs through high-rise, mixed-use buildings one block south of Fenway Park before ending at the intersection of Park Drive, Brookline Avenue, and the Riverway.

The MIT Rogers Building was at 497 Boylston Street when MIT had its original campus in Boston, before it moved to Cambridge in 1916. A plaque on the building serves as a commemoration.

On April 15, 2013, 666 Boylston Street was the scene of two explosive detonations that occurred during the running of the 117th Boston marathon, which killed three people and wounded at least 264.

=== Landmarks ===
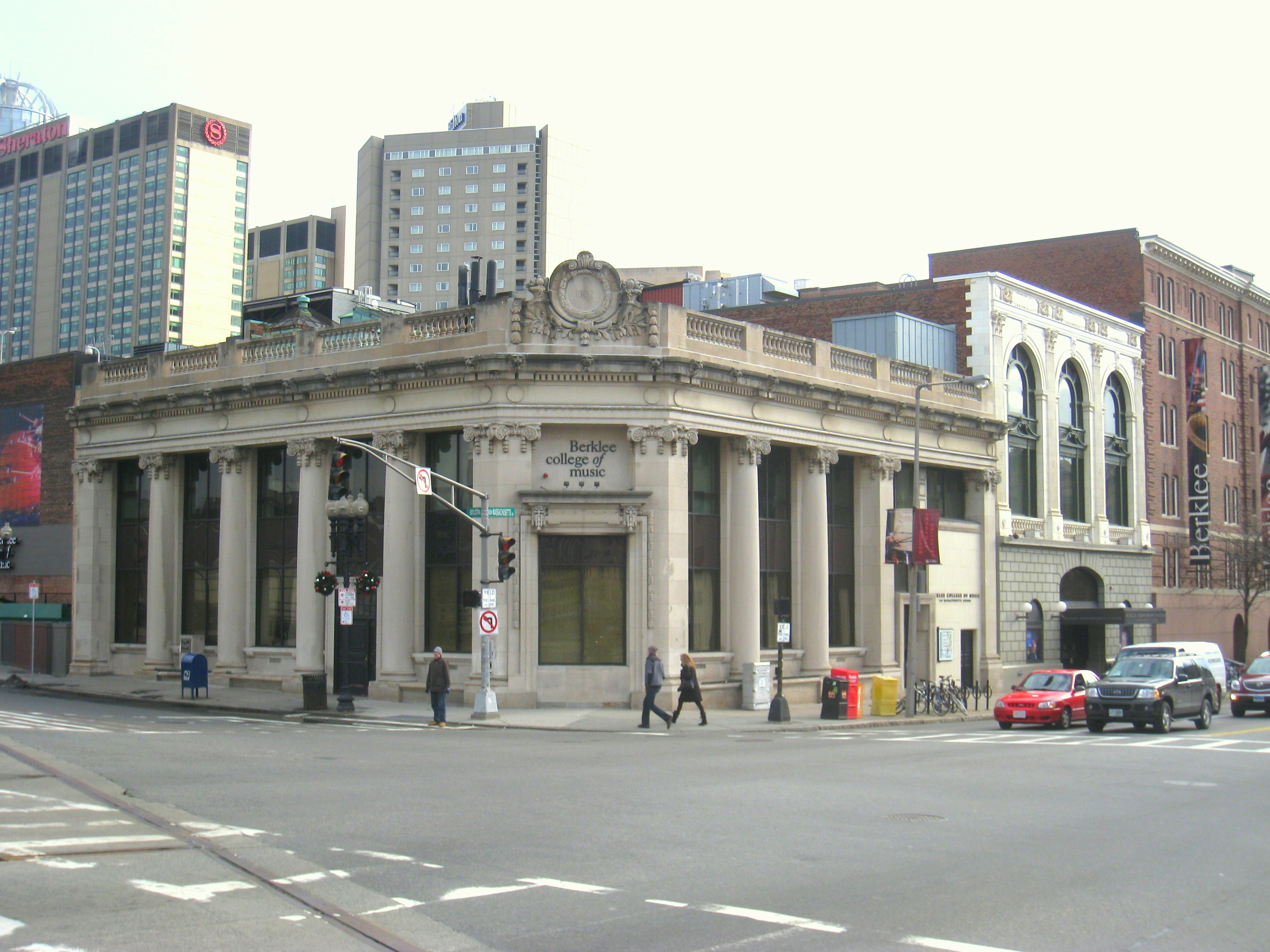
Berklee College of Music at Massachusetts Avenue and Boylston Street

- 500 Boylston Street – a postmodern office building
- 941–955 Boylston Street – houses a fire station, and is also now home to the Institute of Contemporary Art, part of Boston Architectural College
- Berklee College of Music
- Boston Public Library
- Emerson College – several buildings are located along the street across from Boston Common
- Hynes Convention Center
- Massachusetts Historical Society – 1154 Boylston Street
- Old South Church
- Saint Clement's Eucharistic Shrine
- Saint Francis House – a former Boston Edison Electric Illuminating Company building
- Steinert Hall
- Trinity Church

=== Transportation ===
The MBTA Green Line follows Boylston Street in Back Bay, with stops at Boylston, Arlington, Copley, and Hynes Convention Center.

== Notable establishments ==
- Dani's Queer Bar
- Cafe 939
