= Boston Health Care for the Homeless Program =

Health care network

Boston Healthcare for the Homeless Program
- Abbreviation: BHCHP
- Formation: 1985; 41 years ago
- Founded at: Pine Street Inn
- Tax ID no.: 04-3160480
- CEO: Stan McLaren
- Chief Medical Officer: Dr. Denise De Las Nueces
- President: Dr. Jim O’Connell
- Award: American Academy of Physician Assistants’ Caring for Communities Award
- Website: https://www.bhchp.org/

Boston Health Care for the Homeless Program, also known as Boston Healthcare for the Homeless, Healthcare for the Homeless, and BHCHP, is a health care network throughout Greater Boston that provides health care to homeless and formerly homeless individuals and families.

== Origin ==
=== Funding ===
In 1984, the city of Boston received funding for a homeless healthcare pilot program, one of nineteen funded across the country by The Robert Wood Johnson Foundation and the Pew Charitable Trust.

In 1987, Congress passed the Stewart B. McKinney Homeless Assistance Act, making BHCHP a federally qualified health center funded by the Health Resources and Services Administration’s Bureau of Primary Health Care.

=== Founding providers ===
In 1985, seven individuals worked together to initiate a program of coordinated clinical services for homeless people. This group created health care centers based in homeless shelters and hospitals. They utilized a team of medical staff that worked in a rotation of multiple settings.

Dr. Jim O'Connell is the founding physician and president of Boston Health Care for the Homeless. He agreed to the role of founding physician as a temporary favor to the City of Boston, but stayed with BHCHP for over forty years.

O'Connell was trained in patient engagement by Barbara McInnis, a nurse at the Pine Street Inn clinic. McInnis taught O'Connell how to build rapport with homeless patients by soaking their feet. Foot-soaking is still offered to homeless patients at the BHCHP clinic at St. Francis House, the largest day shelter in Massachusetts.

=== Founding set-up ===
When BHCHP was founded, it was composed of multidisciplinary teams of physicians, caseworkers, and nurses. The teams worked in over forty shelters and outreach clinics, collaborating with Boston City Hospital and Massachusetts General Hospital, two major teaching facilities in the city. Primary care clinics were held across these two facilities multiple days a week, with BHCHP staff visiting and supporting homeless patients in their treatment, discharge and follow-up.

== Patients or clients served ==
BHCHP serves homeless communities in the Greater Boston area, providing services to nearly 10,000 individuals every year. BHCHP now offers services at more than 80 sites throughout the Boston area, and is the “largest and most comprehensive” program of its type in the nation, including a patient-tracking system, shelter-based clinics, counselling, detox programs and HIV teams. Many of BHCHP services are now housed in the Jean Yawkey Place complex, a $35 million renovation of the city’s old morgue repurposed in 2008.

== HIV/Aids response ==
BHCHP responded to the crisis by ramping up its partnerships with the major hospitals, conducting weekly sessions in the Boston City Hospital AIDS clinic, reinforcing resources for its drug treatment programs, providing pneumonia and influenza vaccinations throughout shelters and clinics, supporting AZT drug routines, providing care in AIDS ‘health care stations’ across the city, giving out drugs against tuberculous and pneumonia – which killed 10% of Boston’s homeless population between 1985 and 1989.

== Suffolk Downs Racetrack clinic ==
In 1992, Healthcare for the Homeless opened a medical clinic at the Suffolk Downs Thoroughbred racetrack to treat hundreds of uninsured backstretch workers who would otherwise be without medical care. The majority of patients at this clinic were traveling migrant workers who came from Spanish-speaking countries such as Guatemala, Mexico, and El Salvador. Providers at the clinic noted that due to a lack of health care, patients were known previously to medicate themselves with drugs meant for the horses. The presence of BHCHP helped workers on the track recover from addiction, especially from alcoholism.

== Electronic medical records systems ==
In 1996, BHCHP became the first homeless organization in the United States to implement a computerized electronic medical record (EMR) system, which was designed and built by the Laboratory of Computer Science at Massachusetts General Hospital.

In 2019, the organization announced a partnership with Netsmart to implement a new electronic medical record specifically designed for tracking and coordinating addiction treatment.

== Mental health and behavioral health ==
In 1994, just under a decade after its founding, BHCHP began to offer behavioral health services to address a ‘growing, unmet need’. In 2003, BHCHP’s street team integrated medical and behavioral health care by employing a clinical social worker and part time psychiatrist; by 2007, there was program-wide integration of behavioral health with primary care services.

=== Supportive Place for Observation and Treatment (SPOT) ===
In 2016, Healthcare for the Homeless opened SPOT, a medical observation and stabilization space for intoxicated patients. SPOT was a response to the growing opioid epidemic, with overdose from fentanyl being the leading cause of death among BHCHP patients. Within just two months of SPOT's opening, nurses logged 447 visits from 129 patients. Monitoring and communication established between providers and patients help providers better understand current street drugs and their impacts on people who use them. SPOT focuses on giving patients oxygen, rather than giving every person naloxone and potentially making them sick or damaging rapport. SPOT workers only give naloxone to patients if it's completely necessary to their survival. Patients have expressed appreciation for the space to move through their highs without fearing being hit by cars in the high-traffic neighborhood of Mass and Cass and for not having to hide their drug use in bathrooms and alleyways, which creates a high risk of fatal overdose. Due to SPOT, the average number of over-sedated individuals observed in public significantly decreased by 28% in two years.

== Medical respite programs ==
BHCHP has demonstrated the effectiveness of the medical respite model for homeless people. Respite centers allow people who are homeless to recuperate and heal in a safe, clean place after major hospital treatments, rather than discharging them to the streets. Respite centers within the organization have helped stabilize clients in a less traumatic environment than hospitals, reduce readmissions and over-utilization of emergency rooms, and improve overall health outcomes for homeless and formerly homeless individuals.

=== Lemuel Shattuck Respite ===
In 1985, Boston Health Care for the Homeless Program, led by Dr. Jim O'Connell opened the first medical respite for homeless individuals in the United States at the Lemuel Shattuck Shelter, beginning with five beds and expanding to 25 beds.

=== Barbara McInnis House ===
In 1993, Boston Healthcare for the Homeless program opened the Barbara McInnis House respite center, named in honor of Barbara McInnis, a veteran nurse and tuberculosis specialist who pioneered providing treatment for people living in shelters. The facility helps over 2,200 patients a year stay off the street and out of congregate settings while they recover from acute illnesses and medical procedures. McInnis House also serves undocumented, terminally ill, homeless people with dignified end-of-life care. In 2008, McInnis House expanded, moving from a former nursing home in Jamaica Plain to the Jean Yawkey Place clinic in the South End.

=== Stacy Kirkpatrick House ===
In 2016, BHCHP opened the Stacy Kirkpatrick House, a 20-bed medical respite in the former location of Barbara McInnis House. It was named in honor of Stacy Kirkpatrick, a BHCHP nurse of 16 years who died of ovarian cancer. The building is also home to Francis Grady Apartments, 30 studio units for formerly homeless men and women, along with onsite case management and behavioral health services.

== Street outreach ==
=== Rationale ===
In 1985, Dr. Jim O'Connell recognized that the majority of deaths of homeless people were occurring among "rough sleepers", people who sleep outside rather than in shelters. At the time, there was a tuberculosis outbreak that could only be treated by a structured medical regimen, unrealistic to be adhered to by rough sleepers. These factors drove O’Connell and fellow medical workers at the Pine Street Inn and the former Boston City Hospital to practice street medicine, traveling to where clients resided outside to treat them.

=== Early efforts and funding ===
In 1986, the Massachusetts government funded the first outreach van for homeless people in the state, dubbed "The Overnight Rescue Van" which street doctors would ride around Boston at night, checking up on people during the three coldest winter months. The doctors quickly determined that their approach was intrusive based on feedback from patients so they began using food, survival supplies, humor, and patience to build rapport with the community. RN Barbara McInnis proposed that the workers on the van should keep track of deaths among rough sleepers to determine what seasons averaged the highest deaths. In that year, the staff documented 56 deaths among rough sleepers and found that they died an equal amount in all four seasons. McInnis and O'Connell reported this data to the Massachusetts State House, which led to the legislature's public health committee financing the van year-round.

== Haiti earthquake response ==
In 2010, an earthquake in Haiti caused 300,000 people to become injured, and 1.5 million people to become homeless. In response, BHCHP staggered staffing of its Massachusetts facilities, so that 41 of its providers could go to Haiti to treat patients medically impacted by the earthquake.

== Outbreak of bacterial meningitis ==
In 2016, an outbreak of fatal bacterial meningitis occurred amongst the City of Boston's homeless population, especially in shelters. Centers for Disease Control and Prevention (CDC) investigated the outbreak and found close contact over a series of hours to be a risk factor. Close contact is difficult to avoid in congregate settings, such as shelters. Healthcare for the Homeless responded to the crisis by vaccinating 2,400 people in two weeks and providing antibiotics to infected and high-risk patients. Healthcare for the Homeless in collaboration with the Boston Public Health Commission and the CDC implemented contact tracing and provided preventative antibiotics to people who had close contact with diagnosed patients for extended periods of time.
