= Barbara McInnis =

American nurse and advocate for homeless people

- Born: 1935; Boston, Massachusetts, U.S.
- Died: July 19, 2003 (aged 67–68); Hollis, Maine
- Burial place: East Boston, Boston, Massachusetts, U.S.
- Occupation: Registered Nurse
- Medical career
- Institutions: Pine Street Inn Nurses’ Clinic, Boston Healthcare for the Homeless Program
- Sub-specialties: Tuberculosis

Barbara McInnis (1935 – July 19, 2003) was an American public health nurse, tuberculosis specialist, teacher, and innovator who dedicated her life to providing - as well as increasing the accessibility of - health care services for homeless people. The Barbara McInnis House, located in the South End of Boston, is named after her.

== Early life ==
McInnis was born to Joseph "Roy" and Esmeralda (Paszynska) McInnis in 1935. She grew up in Boston and attended Cathedral High School in the South End.

== Career ==
=== Establishment of nurses' clinic ===
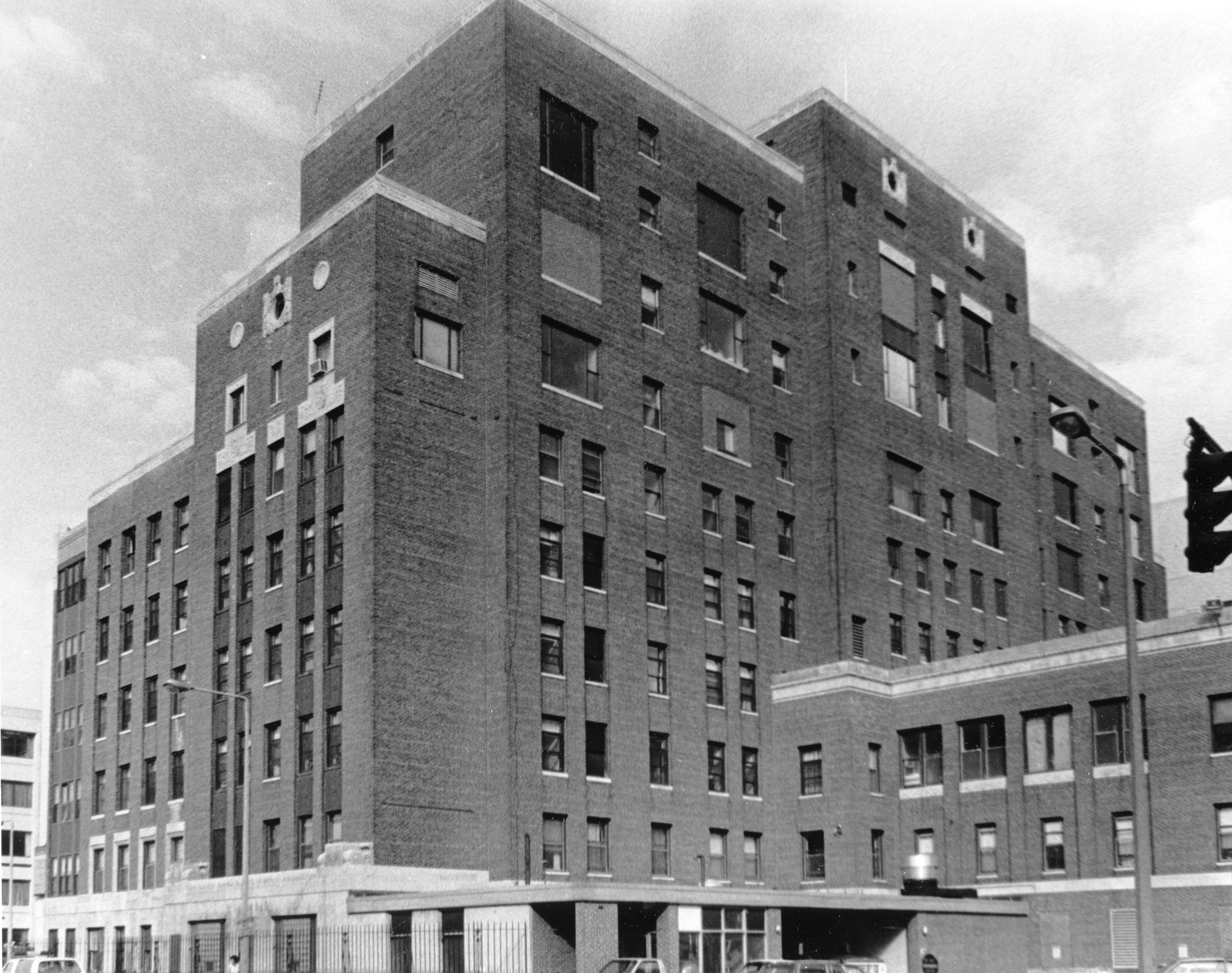
Boston City Hospital, where McInnis worked before the creation of the Pine Street Inn clinic.

In 1972, McInnis and other nurses (including Gail P. Lenehan, Dominic O'Donnell, and Mary Hennessey) established a nurses' clinic at the Pine Street Inn shelter in Boston, MA. The nurses originally worked in the emergency room at Boston City Hospital, but were invited by Pine Street's director at the time to come visit the shelter. Upon visiting, the nurses developed an awareness of how desperately the guests staying there needed medical treatment, and the immense barriers to health care they faced. The nurses agreed to open a nurses' clinic on a month-long trial basis. The clinic at Pine Street is still running, and has expanded to three hospital clinics and 75 clinics in shelters and community sites familiar to homeless people.

=== Mentoring of physicians ===
In 1985, McInnis, and the nurses she worked with, wanted to incorporate doctors in their clinic, but felt doctors had been trained improperly, and that their traditional approaches terrified patients. McInnis mentored Dr. Jim O’Connell and "retrained him" to slow down, respect patients' dignity, be consistent, address people by name, offer care and hope, and never judge. McInnis told O'Connell to remember, "the core of the healing art is the personal relationship." McInnis's ideology was foundational to the operations of Boston Healthcare for the Homeless Program, which O'Connell became the founding physician and president of.

McInnis taught O'Connell, and other newly hired doctors, how to soak feet and made them soak feet for their first month working at the Pine Street Inn clinic. This ritual reversed power dynamics between providers and patients, and gave doctors time to build trust and rapport with their patients. It also allowed doctors to treat common but agonizing ailments, and learn about their patients' struggles and health through the conditions of their feet. Foot-soaking is still offered to homeless people at the BHCHP clinic at St. Francis House, the largest day shelter in Massachusetts.

O'Connell commented on McInnis's mentorship in Harvard Magazine saying,

“What Barbara and the nurses taught me early on is that you have to find ways to break in. When you see somebody outside, you get them a cup of coffee and sit with them. Sometimes it took six months or a year of offering a sandwich or coffee before someone would start to talk to me. But once they engage, they’ll come to you any time because they trust you.…I often say that the best training I had for this job is having been a bartender. Because it’s all about listening and patience and realizing that you don’t have much control over the situation. You can serve, but you can’t control.”

=== Contributions during epidemics ===
McInnis treated clients in the shelter clinic during the dual epidemics of AIDS and tuberculosis. She studied the impact of tuberculosis on homeless people in congregate settings, and utilized these findings to contribute to research on the treatment of the disease.

=== Outreach work ===
In 1986, the Massachusetts government funded the first outreach van for homeless people in the state, dubbed "The Overnight Rescue Van", which gave food, blankets, and medical treatment to folks sleeping outside or in places not made for habitation during the three coldest winter months. McInnis proposed that the workers on the van should keep track of deaths among rough sleepers to determine what seasons averaged the highest deaths. In that year, the staff documented 56-deaths among rough sleepers and found that they died an equal amount in all four seasons. McInnis and O'Connell reported this data to the Massachusetts State House, which led to the legislature's public health committee financing the van year round.

=== Creation of Stone Soup ===
McInnis founded, and volunteered with, Stone Soup Mobile Food Service to provide hot food to poor and homeless people in the South End.

=== Advocacy for elders ===
In 1990, McGinnis and other advocates spoke at the conference, “Homeless Elders: Prevention and Intervention” at Boston University’s George Sherman Union. The conference was sponsored by over thirty agencies, including Massachusetts Public Health Association. The goal of the conference was to create a five-year plan to eliminate homelessness among elderly people. McInnis was quoted in the Boston Globe stating, “a shelter is not an acceptable solution to housing the elderly.”

== Barbara McInnis House ==
In 1993, Boston Healthcare for the Homeless program opened the Barbara McInnis House respite center, named in honor of McInnis and her dedication to Boston's homeless people. Barbara McInnis House is the first respite center for homeless people in the United States. The original facility was located in Jamaica Plain and was laid out like a half way house with a recreation area, cafeteria and a lot of outdoor space. In 2008 it was moved to a Boston City Hospital building in Boston's South End where it was builit as a medical facility. The facility keeps approximately 2,200 patients a year off the street and out of congregate settings while they recover from serious illness. McInnis House also provides dignified end-of-life care for undocumented, terminally ill, homeless people.

== Recognition ==
In 1987 and 1998, folk-singer Ben Tousley released albums Ben Tousley In Concert: Standing There With You and Open the Gates, which both feature the track, "Song for Barbara" about McInnis and her service to the homeless community in Boston, including to Tousley. The song was featured on radio stations in New England in the 80's and 90's.

In 1997, McInnis and her fellow nurses were honored by former United States Secretary of Health and Human Services Donna Shalala for their commitment to outreach and preventive care for homeless people.

McInnis's contributions are documented in the books, Rough Sleepers by Tracy Kidder, Stories From the Shadows by James J. O'Connell, and Health Care of Homeless People by Philip W. Brickner.

Lyndia Downie, longtime executive director of the Pine Street Inn, said of McInnis in the American Journal of Nursing, "She was accepting, nonjudgmental, brutally honest, brutally forgiving, and always took care of others first, all in a very grounded way."

In Rough Sleepers, Larry Adams, a formerly-homeless member of BHCHP's consumer advisory board, credits McInnis with preventing him from committing suicide.

== Faith ==
McInnis was a lay Franciscan who believed in kindness toward all creatures. She had a turquoise cross tattooed on the inside of her wrist. She fed the mice in the alleys outside of the Pine Street Inn shelter.

== Death ==
McInnis died on July 19, 2003, in Hollis, Maine, at age 67. While visiting friends in Maine, she was in a minor auto accident that caused a crack in her femur. McInnis went to the hospital, and during a minor surgery, suffered a lethal interaction of anesthesia and medicine she took for diabetes.
