= Cathedral High School (Boston) =

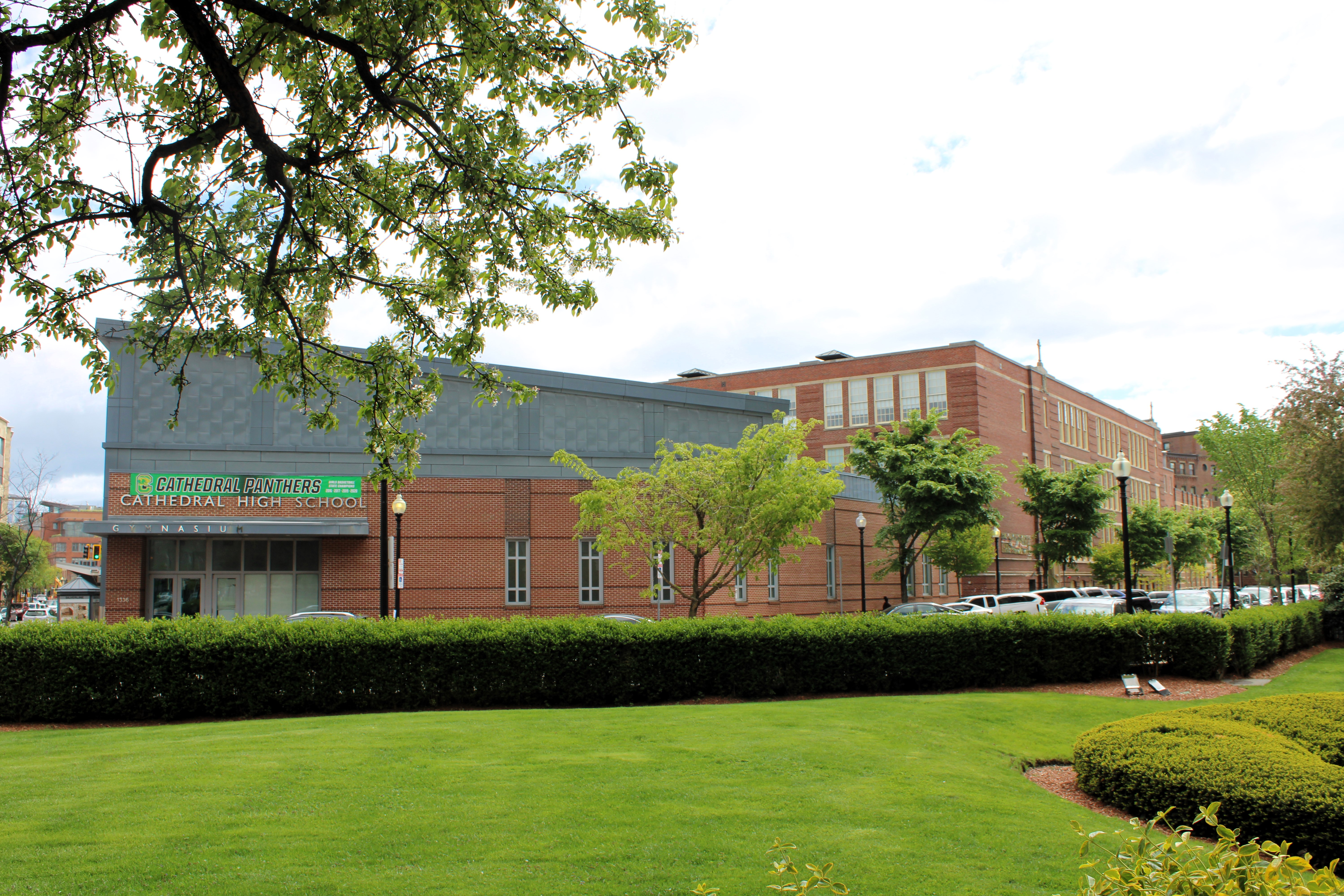
- Cathedral High School in 2024

Location
- 74 Union Park Street; South End; Boston, Massachusetts 02118; USA

Information
- Type: Private
- Motto: Vigor in Arduis (Strength in the face of adversity)
- Religious affiliation: Roman Catholic
- Established: 1926
- Oversight: Archdiocese of Boston
- Principal: N/A
- Head of school: Dan Carmody
- Faculty: 23
- Grades: 7–12
- Gender: Coeducational
- Enrollment: 270 (Sept 2019)
- Student to teacher ratio: 12:1
- Campus type: Urban
- Colors: Green & Gold
- Athletics: MIAA - Division 4
- Athletics conference: Catholic Central League
- Nickname: Panthers
- Rival: Cristo Rey, Madison Park
- Graduation Rate: 100%
- College Acceptance: 100%
- Website: CathedralHighSchool.net

Cathedral High School is a private co-educational, college preparatory Catholic junior high and high school in Boston, Massachusetts, United States. It is located in the historic South End neighborhood, adjacent to the Cathedral of the Holy Cross, the seat of the Roman Catholic Archdiocese of Boston.

Cathedral High School serves a diverse and primarily urban student population, most of whom live in the city of Boston. The school offers substantial financial aid and underwriting, funded through benefactors and an endowment. The school boasts a 100% graduation rate with 100% of graduates also earning college admittance for 16 straight years.

== History ==
Cathedral High School was founded as an archdiocesan high school in 1926 by Cardinal William Henry O'Connell, then-Archbishop of Boston, primarily to educate the sons and daughters of Boston's large immigrant and first-generation American population. Cardinal O'Connell tasked the Sisters of St. Joseph with teaching at the new school.

The Archdiocese of Boston centralized its high schools, including Cathedral, in 1950 under the auspices of Archdiocesan Central High Schools, Inc. In 2004, Cathedral separated from the Archdiocese in the wake of the child sex abuse scandal. The school is now staffed by mostly lay leadership and faculty and led by an independent board of trustees.

In 2014, the school announced a "Catholic Urban Partnership" with Our Lady of Perpetual Help Mission Grammar School in Boston's Roxbury neighborhood. In 2015, Cathedral High will take in Mission's 7th and 8th grades while Mission will focus on K-6 education. Curriculum between the two institutions will be aligned and Mission graduates receive guaranteed admission to Cathedral for grade 7.

== Academics ==
As of the 2014–2015 school year, Cathedral had 280 enrolled students and employed 23 full-time teaching faculty to achieve a student/faculty ratio of 12:1.

=== Curriculum ===
Students participate in a college preparatory curriculum which includes, in addition to standard core subjects, college readiness and academic literacy classes. As a Catholic educational institution, students also take academic courses in religion/theology every year.

Electives include art, Spanish language, and physical education.

Cathedral High School offers Advanced Placement (AP) courses including in English, Calculus, US Government, Biology, U.S. History, Spanish Language & Culture and French Language & Culture.

Seniors are also required to complete 100 hours of volunteer community service and formally reflect on their experience as a graduation requirement.

=== August Institute ===
In 2014, the school inaugurated a summer program called the August Institute for Learning. Students entering grades 7 through 9 are required to attend the three-week program focused on project-based applied mathematics, problem solving, and summer reading. The summer program is in addition to required summer reading assigned to students in all grades.

=== Internships ===
Through strategic partnerships with Boston area businesses, Cathedral students can apply to a number of paid summer and school-year internships in a variety of industries. Annual partners in hiring Cathedral interns include Fidelity Investments and WilmerHale law firm.

== Tuition and financial aid ==
Tuition revenue accounts for less than 14% of Cathedral's annual operating expenses. To offer a reasonably affordable Catholic college preparatory education most of the school's costs are covered by philanthropy.

Tuition for late 2022-2023 is $3,000 per student.

Full tuition, merit-based scholarships are awarded to a number of students and some students also receive need-based financial aid.

== Athletics ==
Cathedral High School teams are known as the "Panthers". They compete as a member of the Massachusetts Interscholastic Athletic Association (MIAA) Division IV and in the Catholic Central League.

Boys' sports include football, basketball, and baseball. Girls' sports include volleyball, basketball, softball, and cheerleading. Coed teams include soccer, indoor track, and outdoor track.

The boys' basketball squad has established a strong reputation as one of the premier small school basketball teams in the state. The Panthers have appeared in five Division IV State Championship games (2006, 2007, 2009, 2010, 2012). The team won their division's state championship in 2006, 2007, and 2009. They were also South Sectional Finalists in 2011, and were Division 4 State Semi-Finalists in 2014.

The girls' basketball team has achieved huge success in recent years under Head Coach, Clinton Lassiter. The team has won the Division IV State Championship multiple times, including most recently, back-to-back wins in 2023 and 2024. They also lead their division in 2016, 2017, 2019 and 2020.

=== Football ===
Cathedral's football team has also developed a strong reputation in Boston recently. Under the leadership of then Head Coach Duane Sigsbury, the Panthers appeared in back-to-back Division 4A State Championship games in 2011 and 2012, winning the State Championship in 2012 with an overtime win against Madison Park. Kadeem Edge, a wide receiver on the 2012 championship team, was selected as a Boston Herald All-Scholastic and was also named a Catholic Central Small All-Star. Also, Panthers defensive lineman Mohammed Braimah was named the Catholic Central MVP, and was also selected as a member of the Boston Globe All-State Team and was named a Boston Globe All-Scholastic. Further honors for the 2012 Cathedral football team also included Sean Elad as the Catholic Central Small Defensive MVP, and Derek Welcome as the Catholic Central Small Defensive Lineman of the Year. Also with the rise of the Class of 2015 who went 41–9 in their tenure at Cathedral included Kejonte Hickman, Jermal Jackson, Justice Turner, Elijah Marcelo, Trehme Haney, Bryan Cedeno and Khalik Clerville.

=== 2011 State Championship "celebration" controversy ===
In 2011, the football team nearly won the MIAA Division 4A State Championship, but lost due to a controversial official's call which overturned a potential game-winning touchdown in the final minutes. Midway through the 4th quarter, Cathedral trailed Blue Hills by a score of 16–14 in the Division 4A State Championship game. With approximately six minutes remaining in the game, Cathedral quarterback Matt Owens raced around the right side of the line and split the defense for a potential 56-yard game-winning touchdown run. At around the 20-yard line, Owens raise one of his arms in celebration before crossing the goal line. The referees threw a flag on the play and called an unsportsmanlike penalty on Owens, which negated the touchdown and moved the Panthers back fifteen yards from the original line of scrimmage. On the next play, Cathedral turned the ball over to Blue Hills, and they eventually ran the clock out to secure a 16–14 win over Cathedral. In the aftermath, Boston mayor Thomas Menino was critical of the call and invited the entire Cathedral football team to lunch. Furthermore, Skip Bayless and Stephen A. Smith debated the controversial call on ESPN TV series, First Take on December 6, 2011. The story made national headlines and was covered by sources across the nation. The following season in 2012, the Panthers returned to the Division 4A State Championship game, where they defeated Madison Park by a score of 22–20 in overtime.

The school honors alumni-athletes and supporters biennially in a hall of fame induction, among which is notable class of 1984 alumna and WNBA player Michelle "Ice" Edwards.

Tufts Medical Center partners with Cathedral to provide athletic training services and team physicians to serve at home games. Tufts also conducts free annual sports physicals and weekly clinics to assess and serve student athletes.

== Extracurricular activities ==
Cathedral students are required in grades 7 through 9 to participate in some form of extracurricular activity (referred to as "Extended Learning Opportunities"). Some of the extracurricular activities and clubs available include:

54th Regiment

The 54th Massachusetts Regiment is an American Civil War reenactment group where students live out and learn history, travel for weekend events, and hold talks.

CHS Voices

CHS Voices is a poetry and writing club which entertains and encourages from traditional poetry to spoken word and slam poetry. Voices helps members refine skills as a creative and performer and hosts quarterly open mic nights featuring students, alumni, faculty, and visiting poets. CHS Voices hosted a night of poetry at the school for Boston ArtWeek 2014.

Mock Trial

Cathedral participates in the annual statewide competition sponsored by the Massachusetts Bar Association. The bar prepares a case based on a topical legal situation and each school's team works on both sides of the case. Students then present each side at different times in a real courtroom setting with another school representing the opposing side.

National Honor Society

Cathedral has a chapter of the National Honor Society and are selected for membership based on criteria of scholarship, service, leadership, and character.

Student Council

Representatives of the student body are elected annually to the student council and, in addition to representing the students to the administration, also assist in planning events including homecoming, service projects, and prom.

Yearbook

The school has published an annual hardcover yearbook, "Cathedra," every year since at least the 1930s. Students assist with photography, photo editing and selection, copywriting, layout design, and editorial.

== Philanthropy ==
The school is supported largely by private philanthropy. Benefactors include alumni, community members, charitable foundations, and corporate partners. The school also raises substantial support through the Adopt-A-Student Foundation, a separate 501(c)(3) charitable foundation.

The Adopt-A-Student Foundation's primary fundraising activities include an annual golf tournament in June and an annual Partnership for Success Dinner in October.

Cathedral is a beneficiary of the Catholic Schools Foundation and its Inner-City Scholarship Fund, the Highland Street Foundation, and numerous other public and private entities.

== Notable alumni ==
- Arthur L. Andrews, Chief Master Sergeant of the Air Force
- Bill Braudis, comedian
- Michael DeSisto, educator
- Zachary Dixon, former NFL running back
- Michelle "Ice" Edwards, WNBA
- Barbara McInnis, public health nurse and activist
