= Probe te meminisse =

1751 papal bull by Pope Benedict XIV

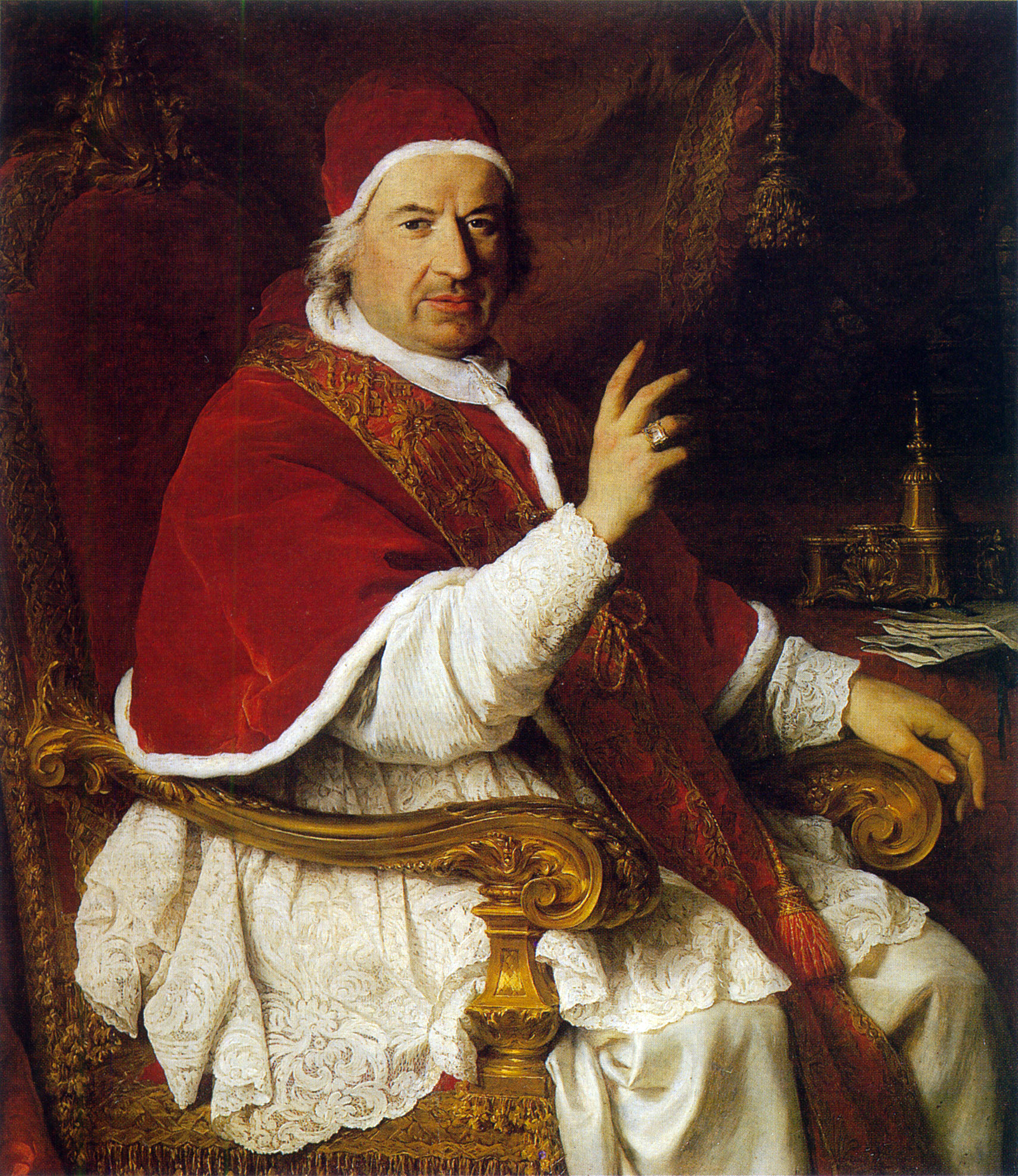
Pope Benedict XIV

Probe te meminisse was a papal bull issued by Pope Benedict XIV on 15 December 1751. Like all other papal bulls, it takes its name from its incipit, Probe te meminisse (Latin for 'You should remember'). The bull authorized the forced baptism of Jewish children without parental consent, building on Benedict’s earlier 1747 bull, Postremo mense. It established ecclesiastical authority to override civil protections for Jewish communities, enabling the removal of baptized children to ensure Christian education, and imposed punishments for Jewish converts who reverted to Judaism, treating such acts as apostasy. Rooted in theological principles from Thomas Aquinas and earlier traditions, the bull reflected the Roman Catholic Church’s 18th-century sacramental polity aimed at controlling religious conversion and interfaith relations, particularly in the Papal States where Jewish communities faced ghettoization and restrictions.

The bull had a significant impact on Jewish communities, contributing to systematic forced conversions and child seizures, often placing children in institutions like the Roman House of Converts. Some historians argue it facilitated Church-sanctioned kidnappings by prioritizing ecclesiastical power over secular safeguards. The bull also perpetuated anti-Semitic stereotypes, including blood libel, to justify discriminatory practices. Translated into Italian, it shaped local ecclesiastical policy and remained influential until the fall of the Papal States in 1870.

== Contents and background ==
=== Background ===
By the late 16th century, the papacy incentivized Jewish conversions by allowing newly baptized Christians (as parents, grandparents, spouses, or rejected suitors) to denounce Jews, adults, children, or even unborn individuals, for forced baptism. Seizures often went unnoticed by Jewish communities until legal efforts, led by Roman Christian lawyers, sought releases; church authorities frequently resisted.

=== Papal intervention under Benedict XIV ===
The debate over forced baptisms reached a turning point with Pope Benedict XIV (1740–1758). His correspondence addressed a long-standing theological dispute regarding the legitimacy of baptizing Jewish children without parental consent. In 1747, Benedict issued Postremo mense, acknowledging that unauthorized baptisms of Jewish children occurred “too often in Rome and elsewhere.”

In 1751, Benedict formalized the doctrine of favor fidei ("favor of faith") through his papal bull Probe te meminisse, which expanded on his earlier 1747 bull Postremo mense. These decrees authorized the baptism of Jewish children without parental consent, even if they were under the age of seven, by asserting the Church’s spiritual authority over civil laws that protected Jewish communities. The papal bull was addressed to ecclesiastical authorities in the Papal States, where Jewish communities were confined to ghettos and faced significant restrictions.

Benedict cited Thomas Aquinas’s Summa Theologica (II.II 10.12), which historically favored parental consent for baptisms, over competing views like those of Duns Scotus. Despite this, he introduced exceptions that effectively undermined prohibitions on forced baptisms. These exceptions included:

1. Christian encountering a Jewish infant in imminent danger of death.
2. Jewish child discovered alone outside the ghetto.
3. Guardian consent if parents absent/unreachable.
4. Jewish father’s unilateral approval, even if the mother objected.
5. Jewish converts could "give up" Jewish relatives for baptism per doctrine of favor fidei.

For the first exception, he declared such baptisms “undoubtedly praiseworthy and meritorious.” However, ambiguity surrounding “danger of death” left the determination to the discretion of the baptizer. Regarding abandonment, Benedict ruled that while Jews held patria potestas (parental authority), these rights were forfeited if a child was deserted.

These rulings, rooted in favor fidei, sanctioned forced baptisms as lawful, valid, and commendable, extending their application to both children and adults. The bull also addressed related issues, such as the validity of marriages involving Jewish converts and punishments for converts who reverted to Judaism, treating such acts as apostasy.

=== Implementation and consequences ===
Benedict’s framework, described by historian Caffiero as a “new jurisprudence,” functioned as a “minor summa” on Jewish baptism. Its practical influence stemmed from addressing specific cases, but the subjective nature of the rules led to potential abuses. In the Papal States, where Jewish communities were confined to ghettos, authorities enforced these policies by seizing baptized Jewish children and placing them in the House of the Catechumens (Pia Casa dei Catecumeni) for Christian education.

By the 19th century, forced conversions primarily targeted women and children of male Jewish converts. Documented examples included:

- Between mid-1814 and 1818, Church authorities conducted 22 nighttime raids on Rome’s ghetto, forcibly removing 17 married women, three fiancées, and 27 children to the House of the Catechumens.
- Male converts were often compelled to “offer” their dependents to the Church upon their own conversion.

Wisch et al., (2019) asserts this framework led to "kidnappings" of Jewish children, as Church power superseded secular safeguards per Stow (2012). Scholars note these measures reflected a broader ideological principle (favor fidei) where "everything that was in favour of the Catholic Church could be exploited," as noted by Johns et al. (2017) and similarly worded by other scholars. Although the concept itself predates him by at least 800 years, suggesting origins in late antiquity or earlier.

Before this papal bull, Catholic theologians, including Thomas Aquinas and Francisco Suárez, had debated the legitimacy of baptizing Jewish children without parental consent. Benedict’s bull built on these discussions, reinforcing the Church’s authority to remove baptized children from their Jewish parents to ensure a Christian education.

== Assessment and impact ==
According to Stow (2012), Benedict XIV saw himself as building on centuries-old traditions of ecclesiastical policy regarding Jewish conversions. The bull’s provisions were consistent with earlier theological principles, such as those articulated by Aquinas, which highlighted the Church’s duty to protect the faith of baptized individuals. The bull also perpetuated anti-Semitic stereotypes, such as the blood libel, which falsely accused Jews of ritual crimes. These stereotypes were used to justify discriminatory practices, including the ghettoization of Jewish populations and the removal of baptized children from their families.

The issuance of Probe te meminisse had a profound impact on Jewish communities in the Papal States. It reinforced the legal and theological basis for forced conversions, contributing to an “intense season of forced conversions” during the mid-18th century. The bull was translated and published in Italian, indicating its significance in shaping local ecclesiastical policy. Historians like Marina Caffiero (2003) note that it was part of Benedict XIV’s broader efforts to regulate sacramental practices across different religious communities. The policies outlined in Probe te meminisse continued to influence Church practices until the fall of the Papal States in 1870.

== See also ==
- Mortara case
- Jewish orphans controversy (1946)
- List of papal bulls
- Converso
- Invitis parentibus (Doctrine; English: against the will of parents)
