= Postremo mense =

1747 papal bull by Pope Benedict XIV

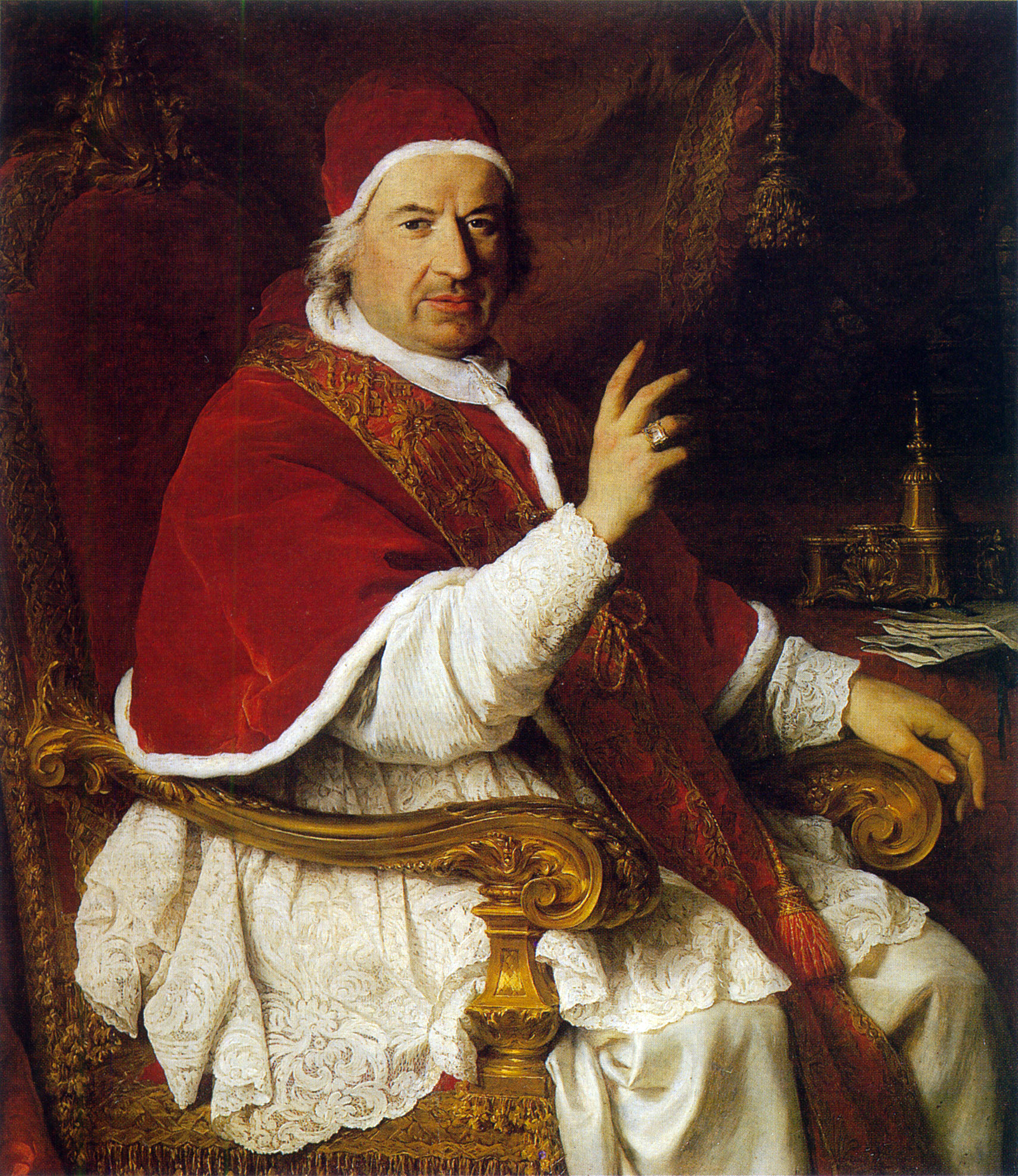
Pope Benedict XIV

Pope Benedict XIV promulgated the papal bull Postremo mense on 28 February 1747. Like all other papal bulls, it takes its name from its incipit, Postremo mense superioris anni (Latin for 'In the last month of the previous year'). The bull restated and developed certain aspects of Catholic Church teaching on baptising Jewish children without parental consent and the forcible removal of baptised Jewish children from their families.

== Contents and background ==
Benedict set out several guidelines:

- it is generally not licit to baptize the child of a Jewish family without parental consent
- it is licit to baptize a Jewish child in danger of death without parental consent
- church authorities have a duty to remove a baptized child from its parents' custody if the parents have not been baptized and to provide the child with a Christian education, whether that child's baptism is licit or not.

Ecclesiastical authorities severely punished those who conducted illicit baptisms, but the fact that a baptism was illicit had no effect on the consequences of the baptism for church policy. Before this papal bull, Catholic theologians - including Thomas Aquinas, Duns Scotus, Guillaume Durand and Francisco Suárez - had also discussed these questions.

Postremo mense was addressed to Ferdinando Maria de' Rossi, the vicegerent of the Diocese of Rome. In 1747, a Catholic named Antonio Viviani had entered the Ghetto of Rome, to which the Jews of Rome were confined, and baptized the three daughters, the eldest of whom was nine, of Perla Misani. Having run out of holy water, he repeated the words of baptism over their 12-year-old brother while their mother was absent. De' Rossi noted five similar such cases that had occurred recently and sought guidance from Benedict, who observed that "every time this occurs, it is talked about as if it were the first time this has ever happened". Benedict directed that the baptized children be removed from the custody of their Jewish parents unless the parents were willing to embrace Catholicism. Were the children to revert to Judaism they faced punishment as apostates. Benedict rejected the compromise position that baptized children be allowed to remain with their parents under precisely defined conditions. He also determined that Jewish children aged seven or older who requested baptism could be licitly baptized and removed from their parents' custody.

== Assessment and impact ==
According to Kenneth Stow, "it is clear from the pope’s own words that he saw himself as building on traditions of centuries standing". Charles Ruch argues that Benedict gave

"un enseignement traditionnel, définitif et à peu près complet. Les principes sont, à la lettre, ceux qu’a posés saint Thomas [Aquinas]. Les conclusions sont empruntées aux décisions des papes et des conciles à l’enseignement commun des théologiens... Quelques cas nouveaux sont résolus; mais les réponses données s’harmonisent avec les solutions qu’avaient reçues les problèmes précédemment étudiés."

(a traditional, definitive and almost complete teaching. The principles are, to the letter, the same as those that Saint Thomas Aquinas laid down. The conclusions are taken from the decisions of popes and councils and follow the common teaching of theologians... some new cases are resolved; but the responses given harmonize with the solutions given to previously studied problems.)

Ruch notes that Benedict's teaching was subsequently endorsed by Doctor of the Church Saint Alphonsus Liguori, other theologians and the Sacred Congregation for the Propagation of the Faith. Indeed, Liguori, considering a similar possibility, writes, "Secondly, it is certain that if the parents abandon the faith to join the infidels, their children may be baptized, even if the parents object. Just as the Church has the power to coerce the parents to observe the faith, it may also take their children from them."

Édouard Hugon writes, following Benedict, that baptized children become a "thing of the Church, they are joined to the body of the Church, and the Church obtains the right over them; and, that she might provide for their spiritual safety, she is able to separate them from their parents." Cardinal Louis Billot considers the matter likewise.

On 15 December 1751 Benedict issued Probe te meminisse, which discussed related questions and laid down punishments for Jewish converts who abandoned Catholicism after being baptized.

The practice of removing children who had been baptized from their Jewish parents continued until the fall of the Papal States in 1870. Other Catholic states, such as Austria, had similar legal provisions. In 1858, Pope Pius IX cited Postremo mense when defending the church authorities who removed Edgardo Mortara from the custody of his Jewish parents on the grounds that the child had been baptized by a Christian servant and by law could only be raised in a Catholic household. Pius held that this was a divine duty imposed by the nature of baptism and that "we cannot" (non possumus) do otherwise.

== See also ==
- Jewish orphans controversy (1946)
