= Finaly Affair =

Custody dispute regarding two French Jewish children (1945–1953)

The Finaly Affair was a legal dispute over the custody and kidnapping of Robert and Gerald Finaly, two Jewish children whose parents were murdered in The Holocaust. The fight for custody resulted in kidnapping charges against Antoinette Brun, the children's war-time guardian who defied court orders to surrender the boys to their surviving relatives after World War II. Catholic clergy members were also charged with kidnapping after hiding the children in Catholic institutions.

The Finaly case was widely reported in the French press. In 2020, materials released as part of the Pope Pius XII Archive revealed that the Pope had personally encouraged Brun to resist returning the boys to their family.

== World War II ==
Jewish couple, Dr. Fritz Finaly and Anni Finaly, escaped Austria after it was annexed by Nazi Germany. They settled in Grenoble, France in 1939. The couple had hoped to escape to Bolivia, but were unable to secure safe passage due to immigration restrictions. Fritz, a medical doctor, was not permitted to practice medicine in Grenoble due to antisemitic laws put in place by the Vichy government. The Finaly's two sons, Robert (b. 1941) and Gerald (b. 1942), were born in France.

Fearing for the safety of their children, the Finalys left Robert and Gerald at Saint-Vincent de Paul nursery in Meylan on February 10, 1944, and shared the boys' location with family friend, Marie Paupaert. Fritz and Anni were detained by the Gestapo and sent to Drancy transit camp on February 14. They were deported to Auschwitz on March 7 where they were killed.

Paupaert soon moved the boys to the convent of Notre-Dame de Sion. The Sisters of the convent then placed the boys with nursery school director, Antoinette Brun.

== Post-war ==
=== Custody battle ===
In February 1945, Marguerite Fischel, one of Fritz Finaly's three sisters, learned the fate of her family and, in May of the same year, secured the immigration permits needed for her nephews to join her in New Zealand. Fischel contacted Brun to ask for assistance with travel arrangements, but Brun would not commit to sending the boys. Brun then had a judge name her the boys' provisional guardian after concealing the existence of surviving relatives.

Auguste Finaly, the widow of Fritz's brother Richard Finaly who had also been killed in the Holocaust, appealed to Brun in-person on October 25, 1946. Brun refused to give up the boys and, according to Auguste, stated that 'the Jews are not grateful.'

Marguerite Fischel requested assistance from the Mayor of Grenoble, the French foreign minister, and the Red Cross, but was unsuccessful. She approached the bishop of Auckland, who appealed to the bishop of Grenoble through the Archbishop of Westminster. The bishop of Grenoble spoke with Brun, who still refused to surrender the boys to their family members. During his conversation with Brun, the bishop of Grenoble learned that Brun had had the boys baptized, though he did not share this in his July 1948 response to the family. In his correspondence with the bishop of Auckland, the bishop of Grenoble stated that he firmly opposed returning the children to their aunt.

After three years of attempting to take custody of Robert and Gerald, their family enlisted the help of Moïse Keller, a Jewish family friend in Grenoble. Keller spoke with Brun in 1949, at which time she revealed to him that she had had the boys baptized. Keller helped Fritz's sister, Hedwig Rosner, take the case to court. Between 1949 and 1952, Brun was ordered to give the boys to their family multiple times, but Brun's lawyers successfully appealed the rulings on technicalities.

In 1952, the boys revealed that they only saw Brun two to three times a year. From the ages of four or five, Robert and Gerald were mostly cared for in institutions run by the nuns of Notre-Dame de Sion in Paris, Grenoble, and Marseille.

=== Kidnapping charges and bribery attempts ===
On June 11, 1952, the courts once again insisted that Brun turn the boys over to their family. Brun lost her final appeal in July of the same year, but did not present the boys as ordered. Mother Antonine of Notre-Dame de Sion hid the boys at Notre-Dame de la Viste College in Marseille under the names Louis and Marc Quadri. Nuns then moved the boys between Catholic institutions in Lugano, Switzerland, Paris, Voiron, Marseille, and Bayonne, where they were hidden under the names Francois Martella and Antoine Olivieri.

On August 12, 1952, Anni Finaly's brother and the boys' uncle, Otto Schwartz, received a visit from Eugen Berthold, a Franciscan father from Vienna. Schwartz was living in Gmuend, Austria, after returning from exile in Shanghai. Berthold presented Schwartz with a letter from Brun in which she asked him to designate her as the boys' guardian so she could enroll them in a state school. Schwartz was aware of the custody case and would not provide a signed statement. On September 12, Berthold wrote a letter to Schwartz at the direction of Brun. In the letter, Brun offered to pay for Schwartz's train ticket so he could visit the boys at a Franciscan monastery in Strasbourg. Schwartz traveled the 34 hours to Strasbourg and visited the monastery twice upon arrival, but Brun refused to produce the boys. Brun claimed that the boys were now at a convent in Grenoble and offered to drive Schwartz there. Schwartz accepted after which Brun stated that she had lied and the boys were actually at a school in Chambéry, but Schwartz was not welcome there. Brun attempted to bribe Schwartz to say that he had visited her over Christmas or Easter and had given her guardianship. Brun then stated that she knew of a Swiss bank account in Fritz Finaly's name and that she would provide Schwartz with the papers needed to access the account if he agreed to a custody arrangement. Schwartz refused and filed an affidavit detailing his dealings with Brun.

Brun was detained for kidnapping on September 16, 1952. She was released in November, a decision that was opposed by the prosecution. The decision resulted in increased media coverage and interest in the case.

Brun was arrested on January 29, 1953, but still refused to disclose the boys' location. Fearing the boys would be found, Mother Antonine had priests lead them on foot through the Pyrenees to San Sebastian, Spain. Mother Antonine was arrested on kidnapping charges in February 1953. Dozens of accomplices were arrested around the same time. Photos of the arrests brought the case national attention.

=== Negotiations ===
Cardinal Gerlier of France and Jacob Kaplan, chief rabbi of Paris, negotiated the terms of the boys' return in March 1953. The Church did not pressure the Spanish monks to return the boys, and they continued to hide Robert and Gerald for an additional three months.

The boys were finally handed over to Germaine Ribière, an associate of Cardinal Gerlier, on June 26, 1953. Hedwig Rosner was awarded legal guardianship of Robert and Gerald and flew with the boys to Tel Aviv on July 25.

== Present day ==
As of September 2020, Robert Finaly is a doctor and Gerald Finaly, who now goes by Gad, is an engineer. Both brothers reside in Israel.

== Pope Pius XII Archives ==
In March 2020, the Vatican unsealed the World War II-era records of Pope Pius XII. The documents show that the Vatican played a role in keeping the boys hidden and initially insisted that the boys remain Catholic when returned to their family.

== See also ==
- Jewish orphans controversy
