= Jewish orphans controversy =

Custody dispute after World War II

The Jewish orphans controversy involved the custody of thousands of Jewish children after the end of World War II. Some Jewish children had been baptized while in the care of Catholic institutions or individual Catholics during the war. Such baptisms allowed children to be identified as Catholics to avoid deportation and incarceration in concentration camps, and likely death in the Holocaust. After the end of hostilities, Catholic Church officials, either Pope Pius XII or other prelates, issued instructions for the treatment and disposition of such Jewish children, some, but not all, of whom were now orphans. The rules they established, the authority that issued those rules, and their application in specific cases is the subject of investigations by journalists and historians.

In 2005, Corriere della Sera published a document dated 20 November 1946 on the subject of Jewish children baptized in wartime France. The document ordered that baptized children, if orphaned, should be kept in Catholic custody and stated that the decision "has been approved by the Holy Father". Two Italian scholars, Matteo Luigi Napolitano and Andrea Tornielli, confirmed that the memorandum was genuine, but added that the reporting by the Corriere della Sera was misleading, as the document had originated in the French Catholic Church archives, rather than the Vatican archives, and strictly concerned itself with children without living blood relatives that were supposed to be handed over to Jewish organisations.

Angelo Roncalli, later Pope John XXIII, served as Nuncio for France, and reportedly ignored this directive.

A related case was the highly public Finaly Affair in France. Fritz Finaly and his wife Anni were Jews seized by the Gestapo and deported from France to Auschwitz in 1944. Days earlier, they had left their two small boys, Robert and Gérald, in the care of a friend. The children ended up in a local nursery school. Starting in 1945, their relatives tracked them down and tried to get custody of them. Their requests were thwarted for years, and the children were secretly baptized in 1948. Documents released in 2020 demonstrate that in 1953, Vatican officials secretly directed clerics in France to defy court orders to turn over the children to an aunt, with Pope Pius XII directly informed of those instructions. Church leaders also tried to plant misleading news stories in the press. After months of enormous international pressure, Cardinal Pierre-Marie Gerlier and abbé Roger Etchegaray finally settled the dispute by transferring the children back to their Jewish relatives, who raised them in Spain and Israel.

Pius XII personally intervened when a Polish Catholic woman, Leokadia Jaromirska, later honored as one of the Righteous Among the Nations by Yad Vashem, wrote him a letter seeking his permission to keep a young Jewish girl she had sheltered during the war. Pius denied her permission to do so and ordered the child returned to her father. He described it as her duty as a Catholic to return the child and to do so in goodwill and friendship.

Abe Foxman (born 1940), the national director of the Anti-Defamation League in the United States, who had himself been baptized as a child and was the subject of a custody battle, called for an immediate freeze on Pius's beatification process until the relevant Vatican Archives and baptismal records were opened. He wrote that opening archives could allow orphans "an opportunity to discover their true origins and possibly a return to their original faith while providing a magnificent story of courage by Catholics. In the hell that was the Holocaust, this is one bright shining light." Foxman omitted this in later statements and ADL press releases concerning Pope Pius XII.

Yad L'Achim, an Israeli Jewish organization, has inquired into the orphans controversy and has demanded that Pope Benedict XVI act to reveal the "hidden Jewish children" of the Holocaust.

== See also ==
- Mortara case
- Germaine Ribière
- Hidden children during the Holocaust
- Postremo mense
- Vorpahavak
- Finaly Affair
