= Boston Edison Electric Illuminating Company building =

- Boston Edison Electric Illuminating Company
- U.S. National Register of Historic Places
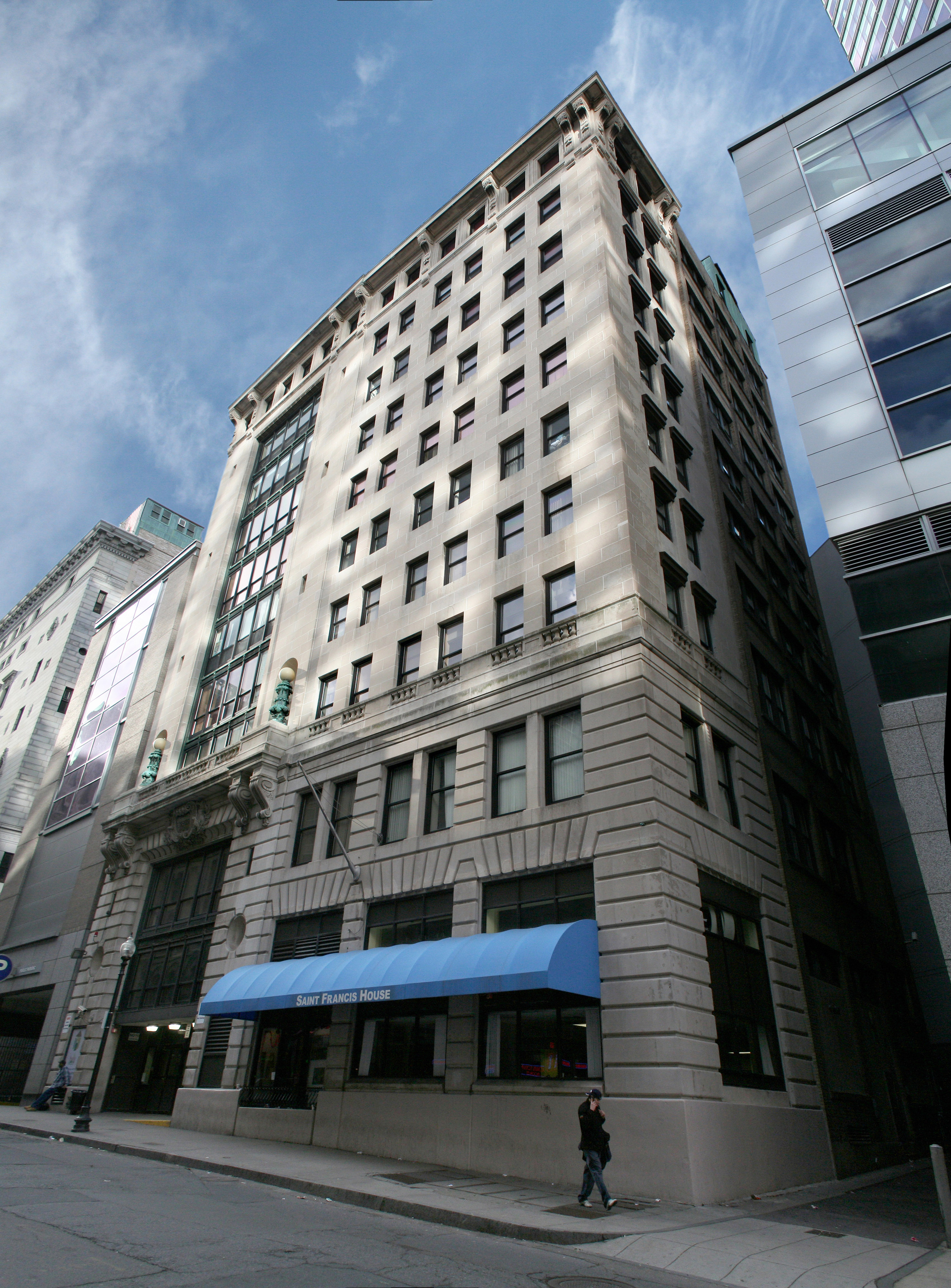

- Location within Boston Location within Massachusetts Location within the United States
- Location: Boston, Massachusetts
- Coordinates: 42°35′23″N 71°6′35″W
- Built: 1906
- Architect: Winslow & Bigelow; Bigelow & Wadsworth
- Architectural style: Beaux Arts
- MPS: Boston Theatre MRA
- NRHP reference No.: 80000453
- Added to NRHP: December 9, 1980

The Boston Edison Electric Illuminating Company building is a historic utility company building at 25–39 Boylston Street in Boston, Massachusetts.

The seven-story Beaux Arts building was constructed in 1906 to a design by Winslow & Bigelow and enlarged in 1922 to a design by Bigelow & Wadsworth. It served as the headquarters of the Boston Edison Illuminating Company until the 1950s. It is an early skyscraper with Beaux Arts detailing and made of limestone.

In 1980 the building was added to the National Register of Historic Places; in 1984 it was purchased to become the home of Saint Francis House.

== See also ==
- National Register of Historic Places listings in northern Boston, Massachusetts
