= Saint Francis House (Boston) =

Day shelter in Boston, MA, US

- Saint Francis House: Rebuilding Lives
- Formation: 1984
- Type: NGO
- Purpose: Helping the homeless and disempowered to rebuild their lives
- Headquarters: Boston, Massachusetts
- Location(s): 39 Boylston Street; Boston MA 02116
- Region served: Greater Boston area
- Executive Director: Karen LaFrazia
- Website: stfrancishouse.org
- Formerly called: Boylston Center

Saint Francis House is a nonprofit, nonsectarian, daytime shelter, primarily for the homeless, located in downtown Boston, Massachusetts, and founded in the early 1980s. It is the largest daytime shelter in New England and serves as an early model of such a center.

It serves free breakfast and lunch in its dining room to over 600 guests each day.

== History ==
Saint Francis House was formally founded by the Justice and Peace Committee from the Saint Anthony Shrine on Arch Street in downtown Boston in 1984, but its origins date back to 1981, when the Franciscans at Saint Anthony's had opened a soup kitchen and some accommodation for the homeless.

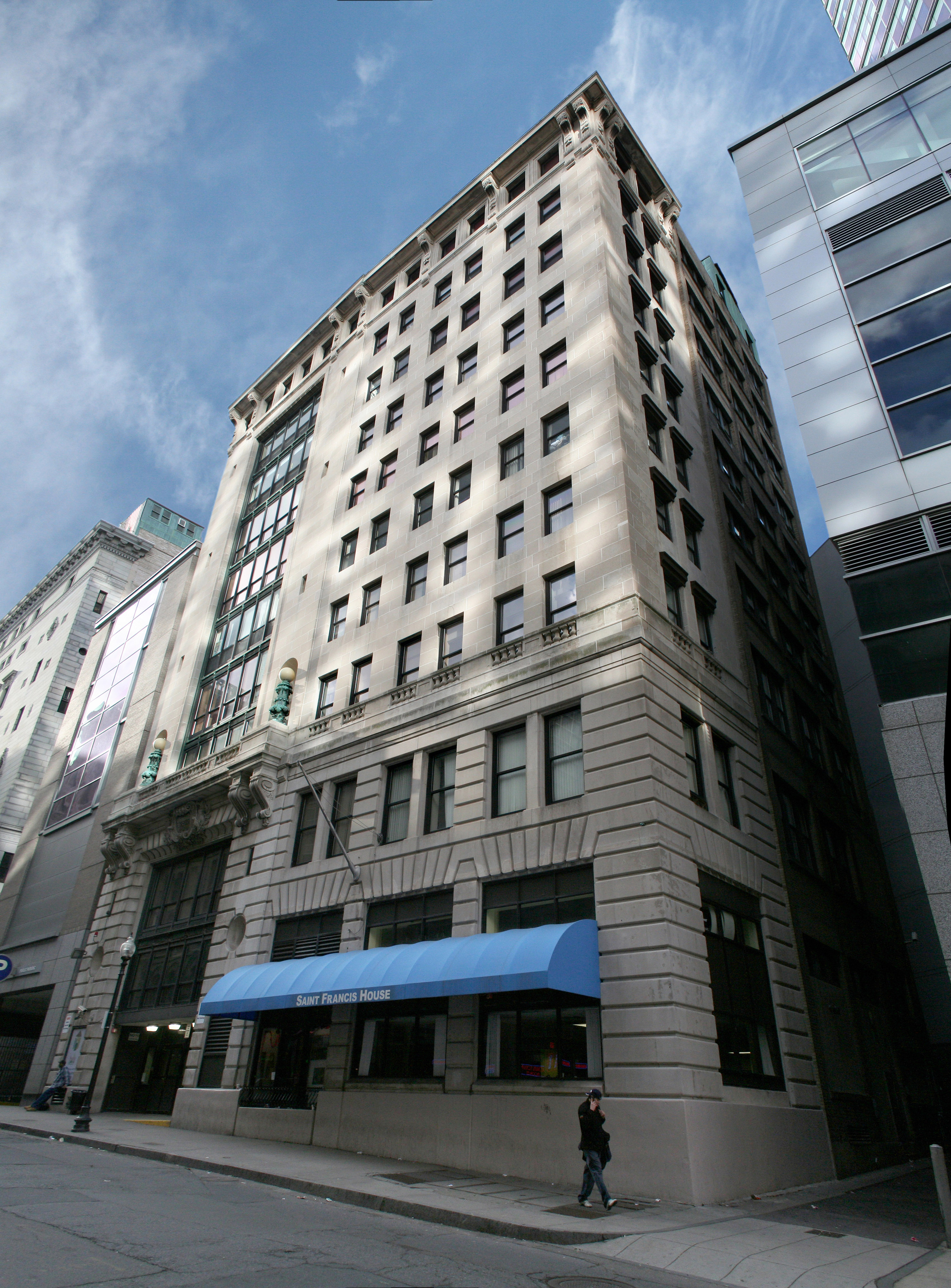
Saint Francis House on Boylston Street, April 2008

As the need for services increased, Boston community and religious leaders called out for the establishment of a center where existing and additional services could be offered to the poor, the homeless, and the otherwise disenfranchised. It was the visionary, Father Louis Canino, O.F.M., a Franciscan friar and then Rector of the Saint Anthony Shrine, who was the driving force in its founding and the necessary purchase of a building on Boylston Street, the historic Boston Edison Electric Illuminating Company building, in what was then called the Combat Zone. Father Louis Canino later became the founder and director of the St. Francis Springs Prayer Center at The Franciscan Center in Greensboro, North Carolina.

Ira Greiff, a veteran social worker and former Clinical Instructor in Psychiatry at New York University School of Medicine, was also instrumental in setting up Saint Francis House with Father Canino, using the model of a settlement house (additionally combining community center or clubhouse models) for the day center shelter. He also shared a vision for "rehabilitative services and a permanent multiservice center for the homeless and that homeless shelters and programs should and could collaborate, and participate in joint public policy and budget advocacy".

Its early historical responses to help the homeless focused primarily on emergency services such as food, clothing, shelter, and medical care.

However, the problem of homelessness, in general, turned out to be more complex and could not be solved by emergency measures only, so its scope and services broadened.

Over the years of its operation, St. Francis House has dealt with barriers that impede people in overcoming poverty and homelessness, by offering an upward framework of opportunity. This includes teaching the skills needed to obtain jobs, housing, further education or, at the very least, how to have lives independent of shelters and institutions.

In 2001, Millennium Partners and Ritz-Carlton who built the Ritz-Carlton Hotel & Towers just around the corner from Saint Francis House, funded the construction of a large atrium in Saint Francis House so that the homeless would not have to stand in lines in the street waiting to get in. Saint Francis House had originally approached the developers to build the atrium out of an unused outdoor parking lot, so that homeless guests would not have to wait on the street in long lines.

In May 2009, a guest was stabbed critically by another guest. The Executive Director of Saint Francis House, Karen LaFrazia, said that this was a very rare occurrence and that in her tenure of more than a decade, she had never seen anything like this and that the environment is safe and a haven for many hundreds of people every day. The people involved in the incident were not regular guests of Saint Francis House.

In October 2009, Fr. Louis Canino, the founder of Saint Francis House in 1984, visited on its 25th anniversary reflecting on how much had changed in those 25 years.

== Operation ==
St. Francis House is open seven days a week, 365 days a year and it provides its guests with the basic necessities of food, clothing, shelter, showers, telephones, mail, medical care, and emergency assistance. There are also rehabilitative programs (employment, housing, mental health, substance abuse counseling and lifeskills training) to help those who are able to move themselves out of poverty and homelessness, to achieve lives of independence, self-respect, and hope.

There is also some transitional and permanent housing in the building for the formerly homeless, living in recovery, and employed.

It also has a very active expressive art room, the Margaret Stewart Lindsay Art Center, where poor and homeless artists create and are given a chance to express themselves, and many of the works are displayed and sold. Saori style Japanese weaving is especially therapeutic and useful for many of the artists. Every year, guest artwork is featured in the Art from the Heart Calendar.

In 2004, the Carolyn Connors Women’s Center was opened, recognizing the special vulnerability of the smaller population of women who are homeless.

Being a daytime shelter model, it is a critical part of caring for the poor and homeless, since most nighttime shelters for sleeping typically put their guests out during the day, early in the morning after wake-up call. Rather than being left to the streets, which can be harsh, the day center provides a place to go and be cared for and also be part of a community, typically much more wide-ranging in services and scope than the nighttime emergency shelter scheme.

The in-house medical clinic is run by Boston Health Care for the Homeless Program and also includes a walk-in foot care service.

== Moving Ahead Program ==
In 1995, the Moving Ahead Program (MAP) was founded as a 14-week course in life recovery, job assessment, skills, and placement. Participants work in internships in companies and many graduates go on to fully regain their lives, housing, and careers.

== Awards and recognition ==
St. Francis House is recognized as a National Model Program by:

- The United States Department of Health and Human Services
- The United States Conference of Mayors Committee on Hunger and Homelessness
- The Social Security Administration
- The United States House of Representatives Speaker’s Task Force on Homelessness

== Statistics ==
In 2009, Saint Francis House:

- Provided:
  - 382,588 meals
  - 8,700 showers
  - 13,000 changes of clothes
  - 16,000 counseling sessions
  - 9,000 medical appointments with Boston Health Care for the Homeless
- Advised guests in more than 10,000 sessions on substance abuse, housing, employment, legal matters, and other issues
- Trained 156 people in their First Step Employment Program
- Graduated the 94th class from the Moving Ahead Program (MAP), the vocational rehabilitation program
- Housed 62 men and women in the Next Step Housing Program

Comparative figures published show the number of meals served steadily increasing:

- 2005: 270,702
- 2006: 292,565
- 2007: 305,923
- 2009: 382,588

Typically, more than 700 meals are served each day for breakfast and lunch, and more than 5,000 hours of volunteer help are received each year.

== Demographics ==
As reported by Saint Francis House in 2008, a brief summary of their guest population demographics:

- Ethnicity
  - 38% African American
  - 30% Caucasian
  - 25% Latino
  - 7% members of other ethnic groups
- Gender
  - 80% male
  - 20% female.
- Age
  - Two-thirds are between the ages of 25 and 44
- Special populations
  - 70% suffer from major mental illness, substance abuse, or both
  - Common health issues include attention deficits, depression, Post Traumatic Stress Disorder, and HIV/AIDS
  - Women, young adults aging out of the Department of Youth Services system, and former criminal offenders

== See also ==
- Homelessness

== Bibliography ==
- Keane, Thomas Jr., "Greiff's activism isn't just a good act", Friday, July 4, 2003 - on Ira Greiff, a co-founder of Saint Francis House. (archived copy)
