= Medical respite care =

Type of medical care

Medical respite care, also referred to as recuperative care, is acute and post-acute medical care for homeless persons who are too ill or frail to recover from a physical illness or injury on the streets but are not ill enough to be in a hospital.

Unlike “respite” for caregivers, “medical respite” is short-term residential care that allows homeless individuals the opportunity to rest in a safe environment while accessing medical care and other supportive services. Medical respite programs provide hospitals with an alternative to discharging homeless patients to the streets or to unequipped shelters when patients would otherwise be discharged to their homes for self-care and recuperation. Typical services at these centers include: 24/7 housing available to patients, on-site medical care, social services, post hospital rehabilitation services and support, and transportation assistance for outpatient care. In addition to providing post-acute care and clinical oversight, medical respite programs seek to improve transitional care for this population and support patients in accessing benefits and housing.

Medical respite programs are offered in a variety of facilities, with many being collaborations between local shelters or motels and mobile clinical teams, or separate facilities that provide 24/7 care (such as nursing facilities or stand-alone facilities). Some hospitals collaborate with homeless service organizations to create medical respite programs, or to pay a per diem fee for the patients that they discharge to the respite facilities.

== History ==
Medical respite programs began in the 1980's in response to the growing homeless population, and expanded near the beginning of the 2000s. In 1999, the national Respite Care Providers' Network (RCPN) was formed from a group of respite care providers, who advocated for continued support and funding for respite programs. The introduction of EMTALA led to the increase of those who were experiencing homelessness to use emergency departments as primary care facilities, there has been an increased need for facilities to discharge patients experiencing homelessness who often need a space to recuperate after their hospital stay.

As of 2024, over 150 medical respite programs have been established across the United States. The largest facility is based out of Boston, Massachusetts (United States), called the Barbara McInnis House. The national average length of stay in medical respite programs is 40 days (30 days median).

== Impact ==
Many studies have found that medical respite programs have decreased future hospital admission, and reduced 90-day hospital readmissions and hospital length of stay for discharged patients. A study out of Chicago looking at the impact of medical respite care on future hospitalizations found that patients who accessed medical respite care required fewer hospital stays (3.7 vs. 8.3 days) in the 12-months after program participation than those discharged from the hospital to the street or shelter. Another study out of Boston found similar results with homeless patients requiring 50% fewer hospital readmissions in the 90-days following medical respite program participation than those released to their own care (the street or shelter). There have been no reported effects of respite programs on future emergency department visits for discharged patients.

Medical respite programs also may have benefits on patients housing status after their discharge, moving from homeless or emergency sheltered to longer term shelters or temporary housing. In a 2022 study of a medical respite program in Alberta, 65% of discharged patients obtained housing within weeks of their stay. Another 2022 study in Vancouver, there was a 42% improvement of discharged patients housing situation to a more long-term housing option.
