= The Hyde Collection =

Historic house in New York, United States

- Hyde House
- U.S. National Register of Historic Places
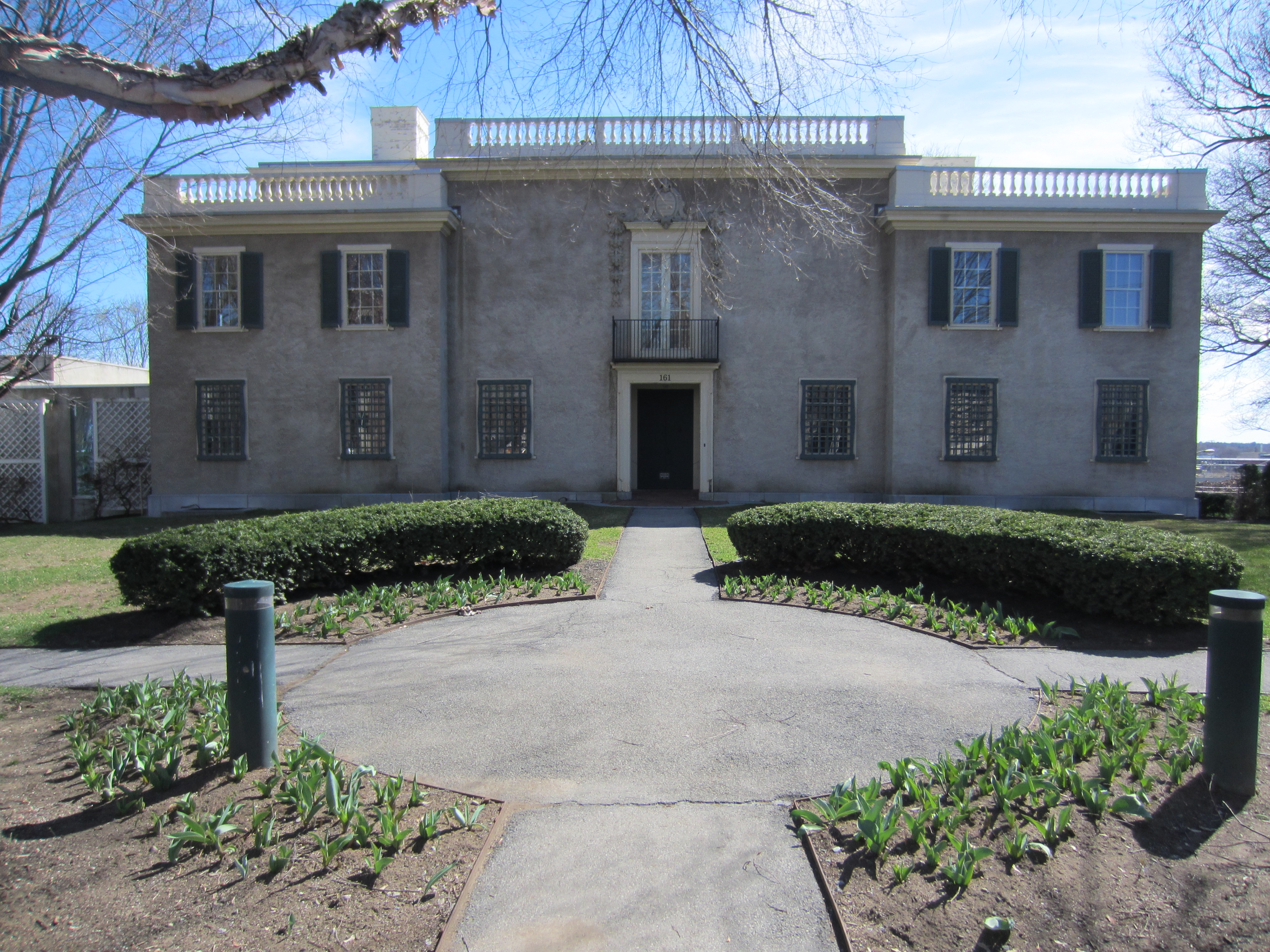

- Location within New York Location within the United States
- Location: 161 Warren St., Glens Falls, New York
- Coordinates: 43°18′37″N 73°38′4″W
- Built: 1910
- Architect: Henry Forbes Bigelow, H.F. Rhinelander
- Architectural style: Classical Revival
- MPS: Henry Forbes Bigelow Buildings TR
- NRHP reference No.: 84003358
- Added to NRHP: September 29, 1984

The Hyde Collection is an art museum in the city of Glens Falls in Upstate New York. The collections were endowed by the Hyde family. The museum is housed in a historic refurbished early twentieth-century residence, the Hyde House, located at 161 Warren Street in Glens Falls, New York, a building that is listed on the U.S. National Register of Historic Places.

Founded by Louis and Charlotte Hyde, the collection contains historic furniture, books, paintings, sculptures and pottery. Now expanded with many modern additions, the museum, while relatively small and "off the beaten track," contains a broad collection including Italian Renaissance and eighteenth-century French antiques, and works by Botticelli, El Greco, van Dyck, Ingres, Raphael, Rembrandt, Rubens, Tintoretto, Cézanne, Degas, Matisse, Picasso, Renoir, and van Gogh. In addition, works by important American artists including Eakins, Childe Hassam, Winslow Homer, Ryder, and Whistler are also present.

== History ==
Charlotte Pruyn Hyde established a trust in 1952 that dedicated her home and her extensive art collection to the community. The trust agreement also set forth the future mission of the museum. Charlotte Hyde's vision, as stated in the trust, was for the trustees "to establish and maintain a museum for the exhibition of art objects...and to promote and cultivate the study and improvement of the fine arts, for the education and benefit of the residents of Glens Falls and vicinity and the general public." The Hyde art collection is a product of the golden age of the private art collector (c. 1890 to 1940).

Charlotte Hyde (1867–1963) was born in Glens Falls, New York into one of the leading industrialist families of the Adirondack region. Her father, Samuel Pruyn (of Dutch ancestry, pronounced "Prine"), co-founded Finch, Pruyn & Company, Inc. in 1865. Pruyn soon became the sole owner of the paper manufacturer, and thus established the foundation of the family's wealth.

Samuel's oldest daughter Charlotte met the young Harvard law student Louis Hyde (1866–1934) while attending finishing school in Boston. They married in 1901 and in 1906 Charlotte's father encouraged his son-in-law to leave his practice in Massachusetts and join the family business. Consequently, the couple returned to Charlotte's hometown and Louis became vice president of the paper mill.

Between 1904 and 1912 Charlotte and her sisters, Nell Cunningham and Mary Hoopes, built homes on adjoining property overlooking the Hudson River (the Cunningham House and Hoopes House). Boston architect Henry Forbes Bigelow was commissioned to design all three residences. All three houses were built by well-known architect and structural engineer Robert Rheinlander. Each embraced the American Renaissance propensity to adapt European architectural traditions to American taste. Hyde House, however, completed in 1912 in the style of a Florentine Renaissance palazzo, stands as the most impressive and significant example of this practice.

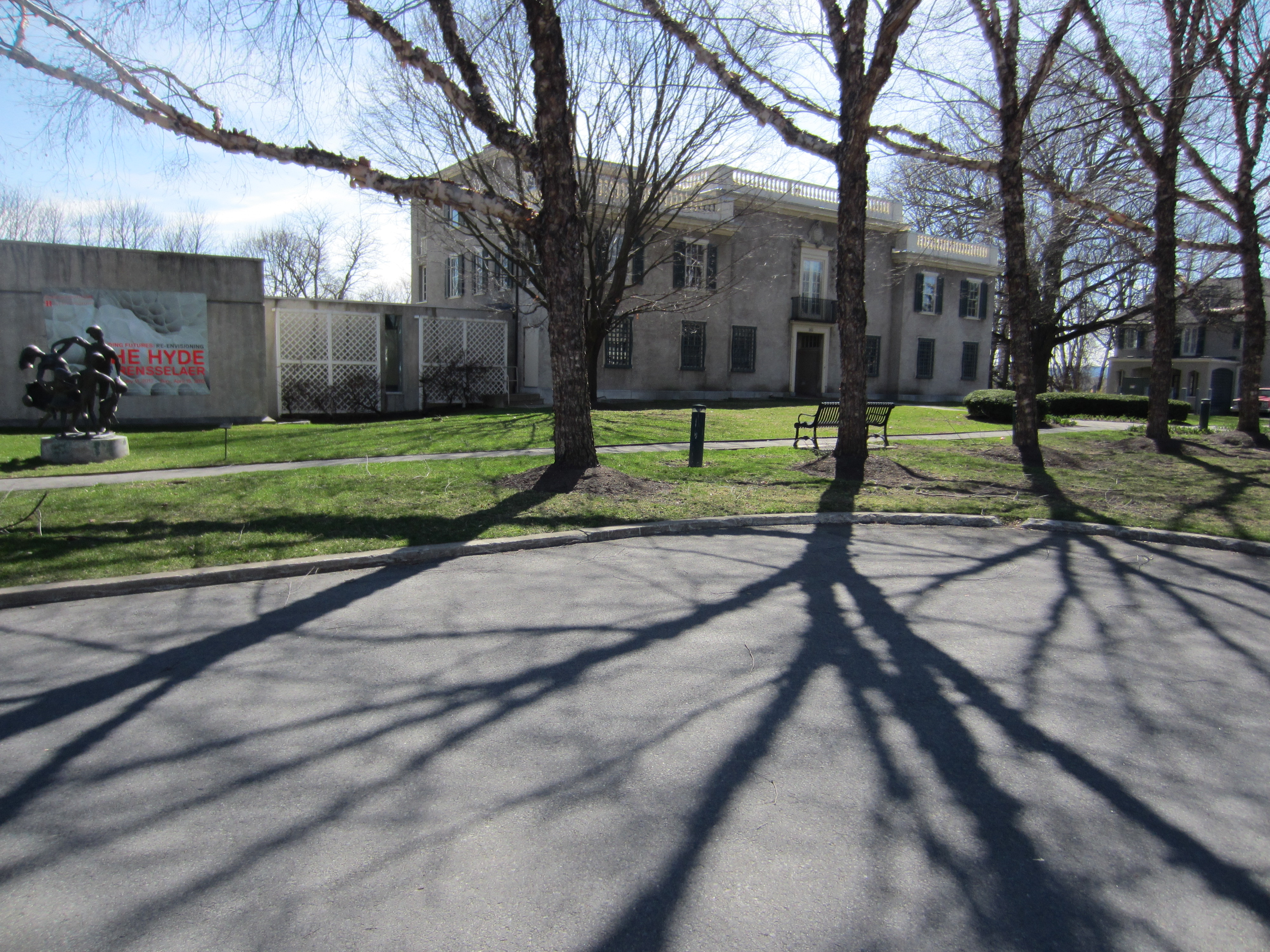
Looking east

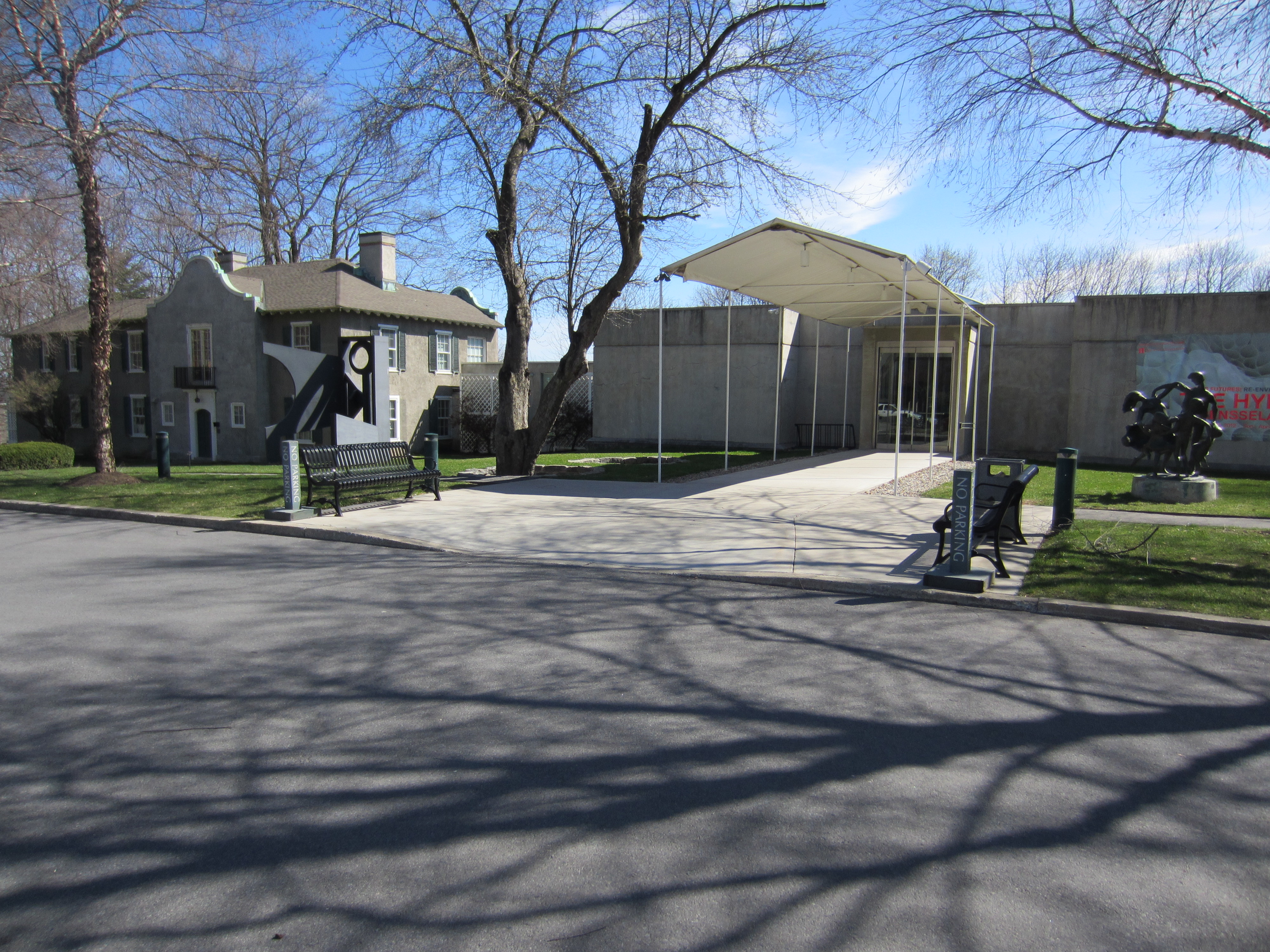
Looking west

With Hyde House complete, the couple began to acquire the furnishings and art works that best suited the scale and environment of their new home. Throughout the decades that followed, they thoughtfully continued to acquire pieces during summer sojourns to Europe, and more often, from their favorite New York City dealers.

By 1930, their collection was widely recognized. When Louis Hyde died in 1934, approximately one-third of the core collection had been assembled. During the next 30 years, Charlotte Hyde continued to expand its scope, ultimately including representative objects from the span of western art history. They were aided in the collecting by the noted scholar of Renaissance art, Bernard Berenson.

Three months after Charlotte Hyde died in 1963, the Hyde Collection opened to the general public. In 1984 Hyde House was listed on the National Register of Historic Places. In 1989, an expansion designed by Edward Larrabee Barnes connected Hyde House and the recently acquired Cunningham House. Overnight, this addition of four galleries, an auditorium, art storage, classrooms, and a museum shop, consciously broadened the museum's scope of purpose.

Today this expansion supports an ambitious schedule of special exhibitions that embraces a diversity of styles, periods, and media. From monographic shows of artists like Winslow Homer and Auguste Rodin, to more broadly defined projects, each is intended to serve as an important complement to the semi-permanent installation within Hyde House.

In May 2004, The Hyde completed an expansion and renovation. The complete restoration of historic Hyde House unfolded, with the stucco exterior completely replaced and restored, while inside, the implementation of a historic furnishing plan effectively captured a once-fading past and returned a heightened degree of integrity to the visitor's experience. In April 2010, Finch Paper announced its purchase of the Glens Falls Armory, adjacent to the Hyde Collection, for possible expansion of the museum and its programs.

== See also ==
- National Register of Historic Places listings in Warren County, New York
