= Henry Forbes Bigelow =

American architect (1867–1929)

- Born: May 12, 1867; Clinton, Massachusetts, U.S.
- Died: August 12, 1929 (aged 62); Beverly Farms, Massachusetts, U.S.
- Education: Massachusetts Institute of Technology
- Occupation: Architect
- Practice: Winslow & Wetherell Winslow, Wetherell & Bigelow; Winslow & Bigelow; Bigelow & Wadsworth Bigelow, Wadsworth, Hubbard & Smith

Henry Forbes Bigelow (May 12, 1867 – August 12, 1929) was an American architect, best known for his work with the firm of Bigelow & Wadsworth in Boston, Massachusetts. He was noted as an architect of civic, commercial and domestic buildings. In an obituary, his contemporary William T. Aldrich wrote that "Mr. Bigelow probably contributed more to the creation of charming and distinguished house interiors than any one person of his time." Numerous buildings designed by Bigelow and his associates have been listed on the United States National Register of Historic Places (NRHP).

== Early life ==
Bigelow was born in Clinton, Massachusetts to Henry Nelson Bigelow (1839–1907) and Clarissa Nichols (née Forbes) Bigelow (1841–1876). His father was the managing agent of the Bigelow Carpet Company of Clinton, which had been founded by his father and uncle. His great uncle, Erastus Brigham Bigelow, invented the carpet loom. His maternal grandfather was Franklin Forbes.

He graduated from St. Mark's School in 1884. He then attended the Massachusetts Institute of Technology, graduating with a B.S. in 1888. While there, he was a member of the fraternity of Delta Psi (aka St. Anthony Hall). After graduating from college, he took post-graduate classes in Europe for a year.

== Career ==
In 1889, Bigelow received his first commission—designing new buildings for St. Mark's School, his preparatory school where his father had been a trustee since 1883. As he lacked a practice of his own, construction of the building was entrusted to architects from the Boston firm of Winslow & Wetherell under George Homans. Wetherell and Walter T. Winslow. Bigelow traveled abroad for several months during construction, and when he returned to Boston, he joined Winslow & Wetherell as an architect.

In February 1899, Bigelow became a partner in the firm, which became Winslow, Wetherell & Bigelow. When Wetherell retired in 1900, it became Winslow & Bigelow. Winslow died in January 1909. That same year Philip Wadsworth, a draftsman with the firm since 1907, became partner, and Bigelow became senior partner of the renamed Bigelow & Wadsworth. Their offices were located at 3 Hamilton Place in Boston. The partnership was expanded in 1928 to include two architects already working with the firm, Edward A. Hubbard and Giles M. Smith. The firm changed its name to Bigelow, Wadsworth, Hubbard & Smith. He worked there until his death.

Bigelow was an architectural traditionalist, and almost all of his buildings were designed in the Colonial Revival, Second Renaissance Revival, or Gothic Revival styles of architecture, as well as buildings in the related Federal Revival and Tudor Revival styles. Some exceptions appear in his early career, when some of his designs included elements of the English Arts and Crafts style and Italian or Spanish Revival style.

Bigelow designed three mansions for his family. In 1899, he renovated a c. 1870 house at 1073 Brush Hill Road in Milton, Massachusetts into a stucco Italian villa that the family used as a summer house until 1917. His primary residence was at 142 Chestnut Street on Beacon Hill in Boston. Designed by Bigelow in 1915 in the Italian style, the family mansion featured a large courtyard. In June 1916, an entire issue of The American Architect was dedicated to this house, with eighteen full-page photographs. Another family summer home was Pineapple Court, ac. 1925 Spanish Revival style villa at 89 West Street in Beverly Farms, Massachusetts.

His last work, the Art Deco Ansin Building for the Boston Electric Illuminating Company, was in its final phases of design at the time of his death.

== Professional affiliations ==
Bigelow became a member of the American Institute of Architects in 1901 and was elected to the College of Fellows in 1905. He was an associate fellow in the Boston Society of Architects and a member of the Boston Architectural Club. In 1917, he was appointed to the Visiting Committee for the School of Architecture at the Massachusetts Institute of Technology.

Starting in 1919, he was a trustee of the Boston Museum of Fine Arts, serving as chairman of the committee on the new wing and as a member of the museum committee. He was also a member of the Boston Art Commission.

== Personal life ==
On October 14, 1896, Bigelow married Eliza Frothingham Davis (1871–1907) in All Saints' Church in Boston. She was the daughter of Maria L. Robbins and the Hon. Edward L. Davis of Boston and Worcester. Their children were Henry Davis Bigelow (1897–1974), Edward Livingston Bigelow (1899-1975) and twins Chandler Bigelow (1900–1987) and Nelson Bigelow (1900–1988). Eliza died in Tours in 1907.

On June 1, 1912, he married Susan Thayer (1885–1942) in Lancaster, Massachusetts. She was a daughter of Susan Spring and Eugene Van Rensselaer Thayer, a member of the wealthy Boston Brahmin Thayer family. His children by the second marriage were Eugene Thayer Bigelow (1913–1990) and Henry Forbes Bigelow Jr. (1922–1944).

He was a member of the Hoosie Whisick in Canton, the Norfolk Hunt Club, the Puritan Club, the Somerset Club, the Tavern Club, and the Union Club of Boston. He was a trustee of St. Marks School and was an Episcopalian.

Bigelow died in 1929 at his summer home in Beverly Farms, Massachusetts at the age of 62.

== Selected works ==
Project	Date	Location	Status	Ref
St. Mark's School Main School Building	1889–91	Southborough, Massachusetts		
St. Mark's School Belmont Chapel	1889–91	Southborough, Massachusetts		
Henry K. Swinscoe House	1893	1 Bourne Street, Clinton, Massachusetts		
Forbes House, Milton Academy	1893	170 Centre Street, Milton, Massachusetts		
Gilbert Building (Major's Inn and Gilbert Block)	1893–94	3-9 Commercial Street, Gilbertsville, New York	NRHP (Note: Included on the National Register of Historic Places)	
Mrs. Charles Appleton House	1894	4 Hawthorne Road, Brookline, Massachusetts		
Elizabeth (née Appleton) and Charles Packard Ware House	1894	52 Allerton Street, Brookline, Massachusetts		
Hotel Touraine	1897	62 Boylston Street, Boston, Massachusetts		
Shreve Crump & Low	1898–1909	147 Tremont Street, Boston, Massachusetts		
Lyman Davenport–Henry F. Bigelow House (remodeling)	1899	1073 Brush Hill Road in Milton, Massachusetts		
Wigglesworth Building, Milton Academy	1900	170 Centre Street, Milton, Massachusetts		
Wolcott Building, Milton Academy	1900	170 Centre Street, Milton, Massachusetts		
Board of Trade Building	1901	2–22 Broad and 1–9 India Streets, Boston, Massachusetts	NRHD (Note: Included in a National Register Historic District)	
Canton Public Library	1901–02	786 Washington Street, Canton, Massachusetts		
Bigelow Free Public Library	1902–03	54 Walnut Street, Clinton, Massachusetts		
Compton Building	1902–03	159–175 Devonshire Street, Boston, Massachusetts	NRHP	
Needham Town Hall	1902–03	1471 Highland Avenue, Needham, Massachusetts	NRHD	
L Street Generating Station, Edison Electric Illuminating Company	1904	776–834 Summer Street, South Boston, Boston, Massachusetts		
Substation, Edison Electric Illuminating Company	1904	374 Homer Street, Newton, Massachusett	NRHP	
Hoopes House	1904	153 Warren Street, Glen Falls, New York	NRHP	
Finch, Pruyn and Company Office Building	1904	1 Glenn Street, Glenn Falls, New York		
"Storrow Farm" for James J. Storrow (now Carroll School)	1905	25 Baker Ridge Road, Lincoln, Massachusetts		
Frederick Thomas Bradbury House	1905	285 Commonwealth, Back Bay, Boston, Massachusetts		
Worcester County Institution for Savings Building	1906	365 Main Street, Worcester, Massachusetts	NRHP	
Alexander Sylvanus Porter Jr. House	1906	189 Marlborough, Back Bay, Boston, Massachusetts		
Edison Electric Illuminating Company of Boston Building	1906,1922	39 Boylston Street, Boston, Massachusetts	NRHP	
Schlesinger Library, Radcliffe College	1906	10 Garden Street, Cambridge, Massachusetts		
National Shawmut Bank Building	1907	Devonshire, Water, and Congress Streets, Boston, Massachusetts		
"The Pines" for Mary Cabot (née Higginson) and Philip Sears	1907	Hale Street, Prides Crossing, Beverly, Massachusetts		
"Crownledge" for Eugene V. R. Thayer Jr. (now Trivium School)	1909	471 Langen Road, Lancaster, Massachusetts		
American Antiquarian Society Building	1909–10	85 Salisbury Street, Worcester, Massachusetts	NHL (Note: Designated a National Historic Landmark)	(Note: Designed in association with supervising architect R. Clipston Sturgis.)
Rose Linzee Dexter House (remodeling)	1910	400 Beacon, Back Bay, Boston, Massachusetts		
Hyde House	1910–11	161 Warren Street, Glen Falls, New York	NRHP	
Cunningham House (Nell Pruyn's Ceramic Studio)	1910–11	169 Warren Street, Glenn Falls, New York	NRHP	
Robert Saltonstall House	c. 1911	Milton, Massachusetts		
Fifth Meeting House (restoration)	1912	Lancaster, Massachusetts		
Eugene V. R. Thayer House (remodeling)	1912	340 Beacon, Back Bay, Boston, Massachusetts		
Mabel Hunt Slater House (ballroom addition)	1913	448 Beacon, Back Bay, Boston, Massachusetts		
Number Six Club (Delta Psi Fraternity House)	1913	428 Memorial Drive, Cambridge, Massachusetts		
"Warren Farm" for Mary Cabot (née Higginson) and Philip Sears	1913	260 Heath Street, Brookline, Massachusetts		
Boston Athenæum penthouse and rear additions	1913–14	10 1/2 Beacon Street, Boston, Massachusetts	NHL	
James J. Storrow House (remodeling)	1915	417 Beacon, Back Bay, Boston, Massachusetts		
Charles Taylor Lovering Jr. House (remodeling)	1915	9 Gloucester, Back Bay, Boston, Massachusetts		
Henry Forbes Bigelow House	c. 1915	142 Chestnut Street, Beacon Hill, Boston, Massachusetts		
Caroline and Charles Wilson Taintor House (remodeling)	1916	149 Beacon, Back Bay, Boston, Massachusetts		
Eliza and George Hemenway Cabot House (remodeling)	1916	169 Marlborough, Back Bay, Boston, Massachusetts		
Susannah and Otis Norcross Jr. House (remodeling)	1916	249 Marlborough, Back Bay, Boston, Massachusetts		
Interurban Building	1916	1500 Jackson Street, Dallas, Texas		(Note: Designed in association with engineers Stone & Webster.)
Weston Town Hall	1916–17	11 Town House Road, Weston, Massachusetts		
Dorothy and Dr. Francis Minot Rackemann House (remodeling)	1917	263 Beacon, Back Bay, Boston, Massachusetts		
Katherine Eliot Bullard House (remodeling)	1917	39 Commonwealth, Back Bay, Boston, Massachusetts		
Building No. 220, Rock Island Arsenal	1917–18	Rock Island, Illinois		
Paul Barron Watson House (remodeling)	1919	278 Clarendon (203 Beacon), Back Bay, Boston, Massachusetts		
Caroline and Edward C. Storrow House (remodeling)	1919	191 Marlborough, Back Bay, Boston, Massachusetts		
Margaret and Albert Creighton House (remodeling)	1921	340 Beacon, Back Bay, Boston, Massachusetts		
Katharine and J. Lewis Stackpole House (remodeling)	1922	292 Beacon, Back Bay, Boston, Massachusetts		
First Church of Christ, Scientist	1923–24, 1929–30	13 Waterhouse Street, Cambridge, Massachusetts		
Pineapple Court (Henry F. Bigelow House)	c. 1925	89 West Street, Beverly Farms, Essex, Massachusetts		
Eliot Wadsworth House (remodeling)	1925	180 Marlborough, Back Bay, Boston, Massachusetts		
137 Marlboro Street Trust Apartment Building	1925	137 Marlborough (317 Dartmouth), Back Bay, Boston, Massachusetts		
McGinley Mansion	1925	582 Blue Hill Avenue, Milton, Massachusetts		
Apartment Building	1926	116 Charles Street, Beacon Hill, Boston, Massachusetts		
Susannah and Harcourt Amory Jr. House (remodeling)	1926	174 Marlborough, Back Bay, Boston, Massachusetts		
Chilton Club (remodeling)	1926	50 Commonwealth, Back Bay, Boston, Massachusetts		
Mary and Arnold Welles Hunnewell House (remodeling)	1926	129 Commonwealth, Back Bay, Boston, Massachusetts		
Investors Securities Trust Apartment Building	1926–27	192 Commonwealth, Back Bay, Boston, Massachusetts		
Apartment Building	1927	10 Otis Place, Beacon Hill, Boston, Massachusetts		
Hannah Adams Pfaff High School (former)	1927	3 Dale Street, Medfield, Massachusetts		
Frederica and Richard Dudley Sears Jr. House (remodeling)	1927	9 Exeter, Back Bay, Boston, Massachusetts		
Madison Apartments for Beacon Street Trust	1927	172 Beacon, Back Bay, Boston, Massachusetts		
Medical Office Building	1927–28	264 Beacon, Back Bay, Boston, Massachusetts		
House	1928	240 Dudley Street, Brookline, Massachusetts		
Mary (née Ames) Frothingham House (remodeling)	1929	7 Commonwealth, Back Bay, Boston, Massachusetts		
Mary and Edward Henry Best House (remodeling)	1929	80 Commonwealth, Back Bay, Boston, Massachusetts		
Eliza and George Edward Cabot House (remodeling)	1929	167 Marlborough, Back Bay, Boston, Massachusetts		
Eliza and George Edward Cabot House (remodeling)	1929	169 Marlborough, Back Bay, Boston, Massachusetts		
Nancy and Eliot Wadsworth House (remodeling)	1929	180 Marlborough, Back Bay, Boston, Massachusetts		
Ansin Building (now Emerson College)	1930–31	180 Tremont Street, Boston, Massachusetts		
Tremont Building		Boston, Massachusetts		

== Gallery of architectural works ==
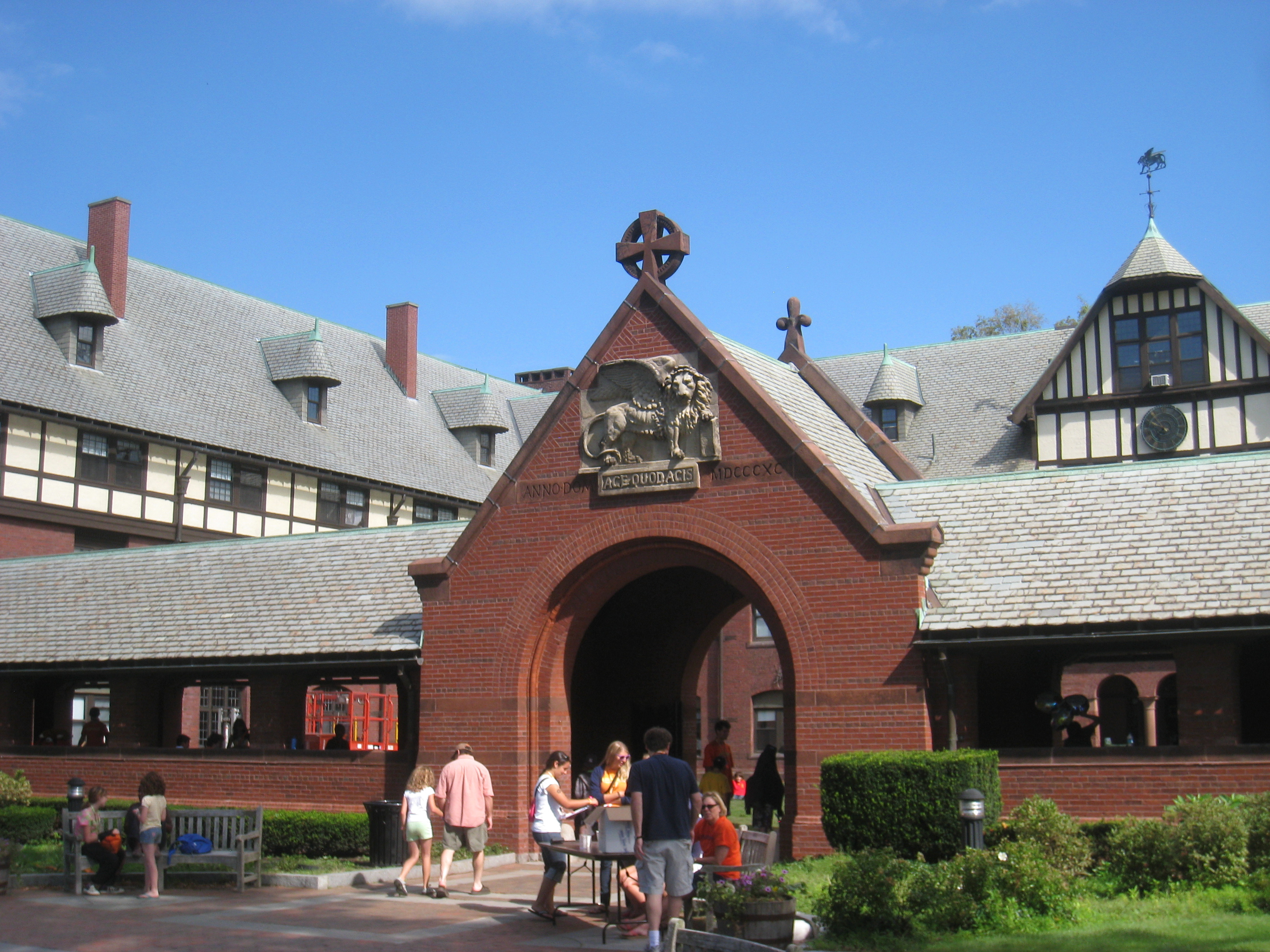
Main School Building, St. Mark's School, Southborough, Massachusetts, 1889-91.

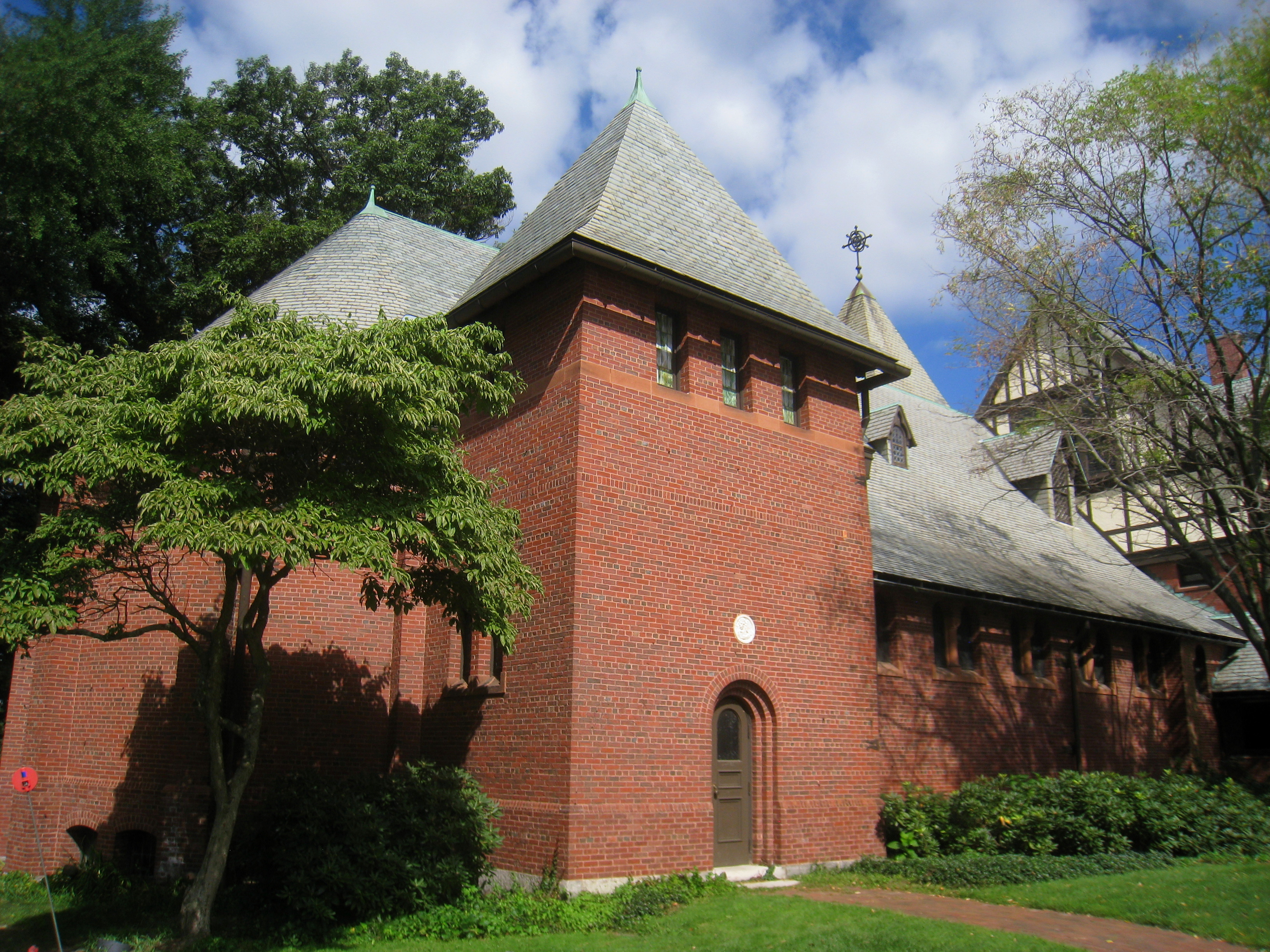
Belmont Chapel, St. Mark's School, Southborough, Massachusetts, 1889-91.

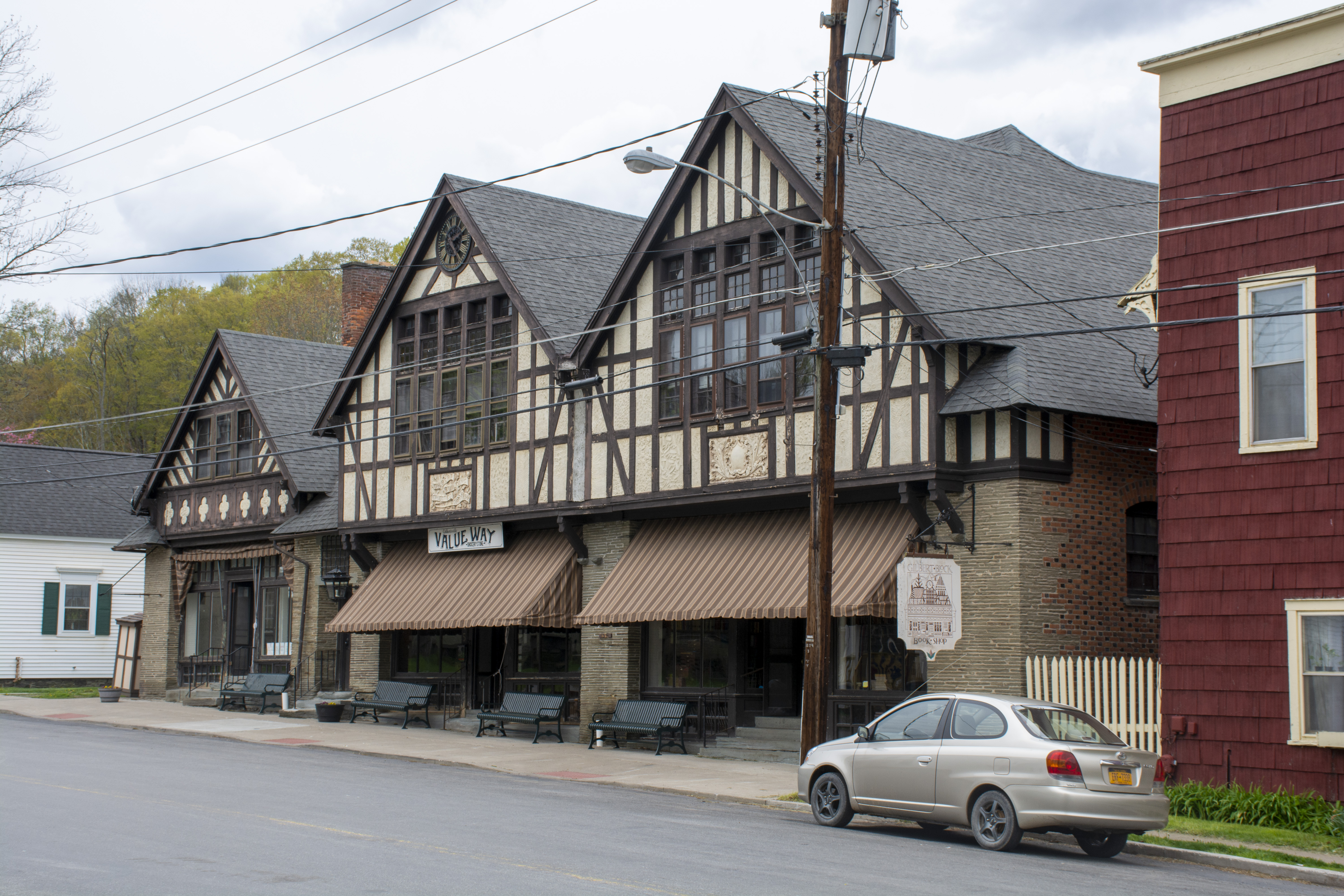
Gilbert Building, Gilbertsville, New York, 1893-94.

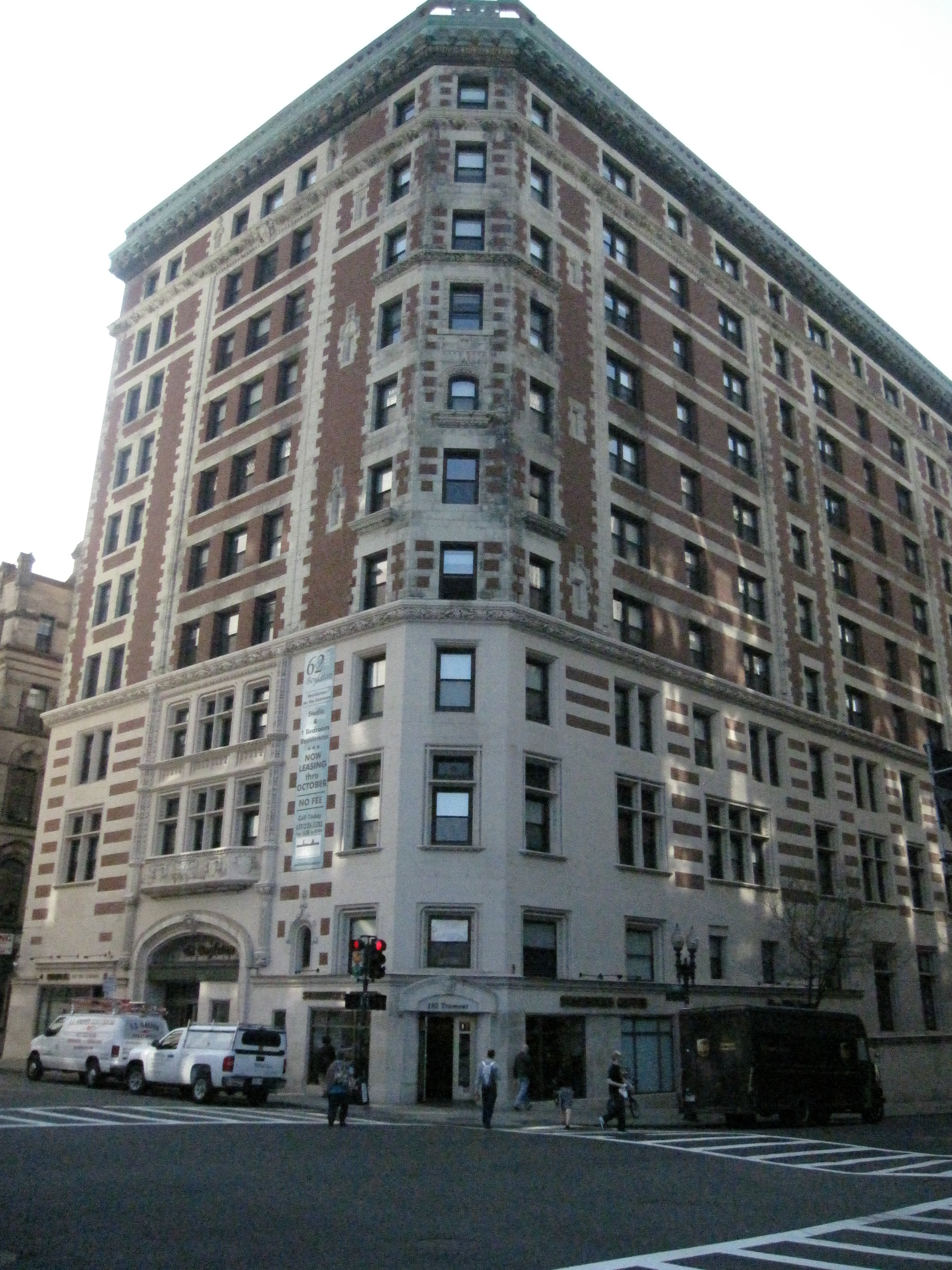
Hotel Touraine, Boston, Massachusetts, 1897.

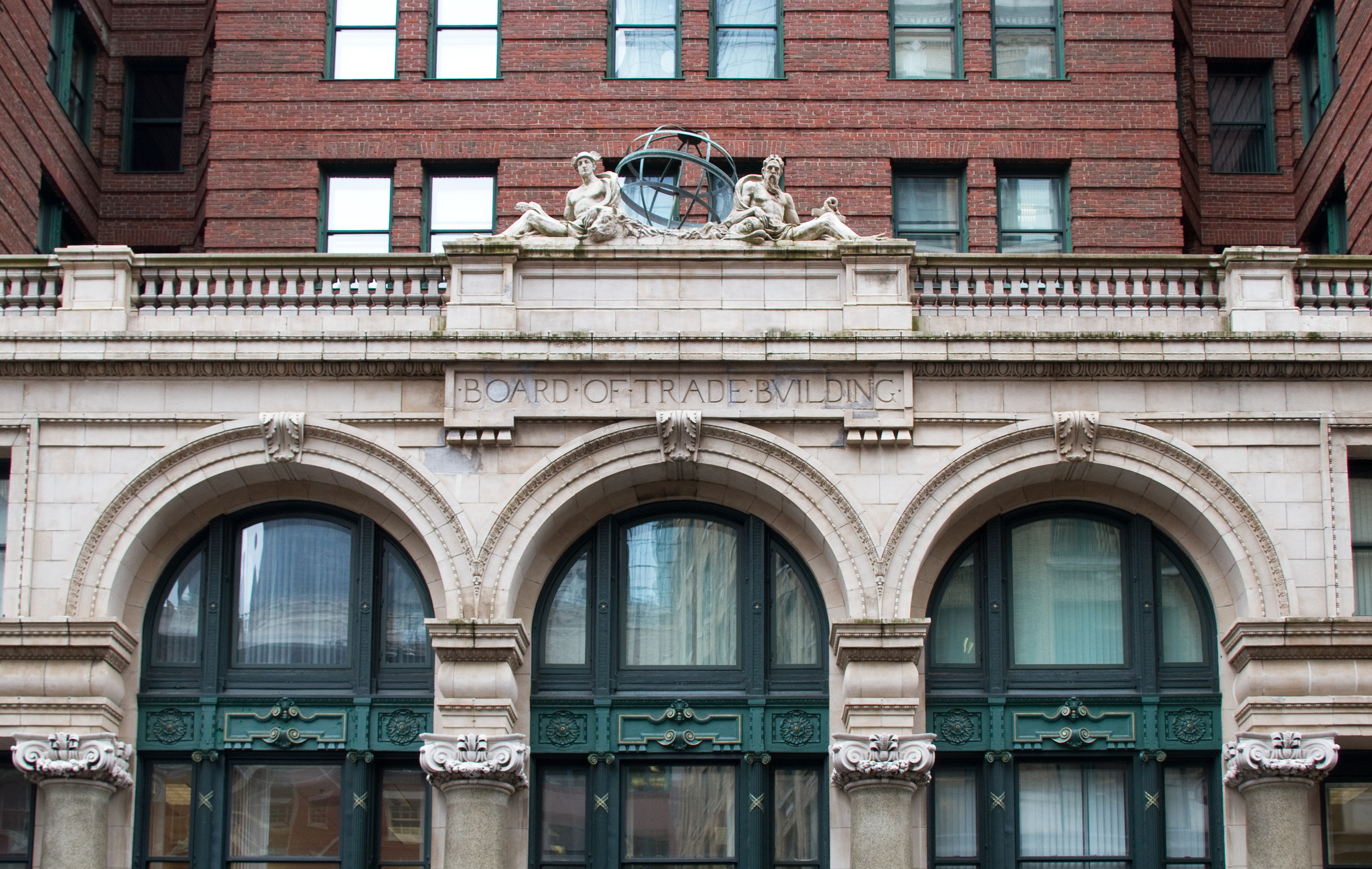
Board of Trade Building, Boston, Massachusetts, 1901.

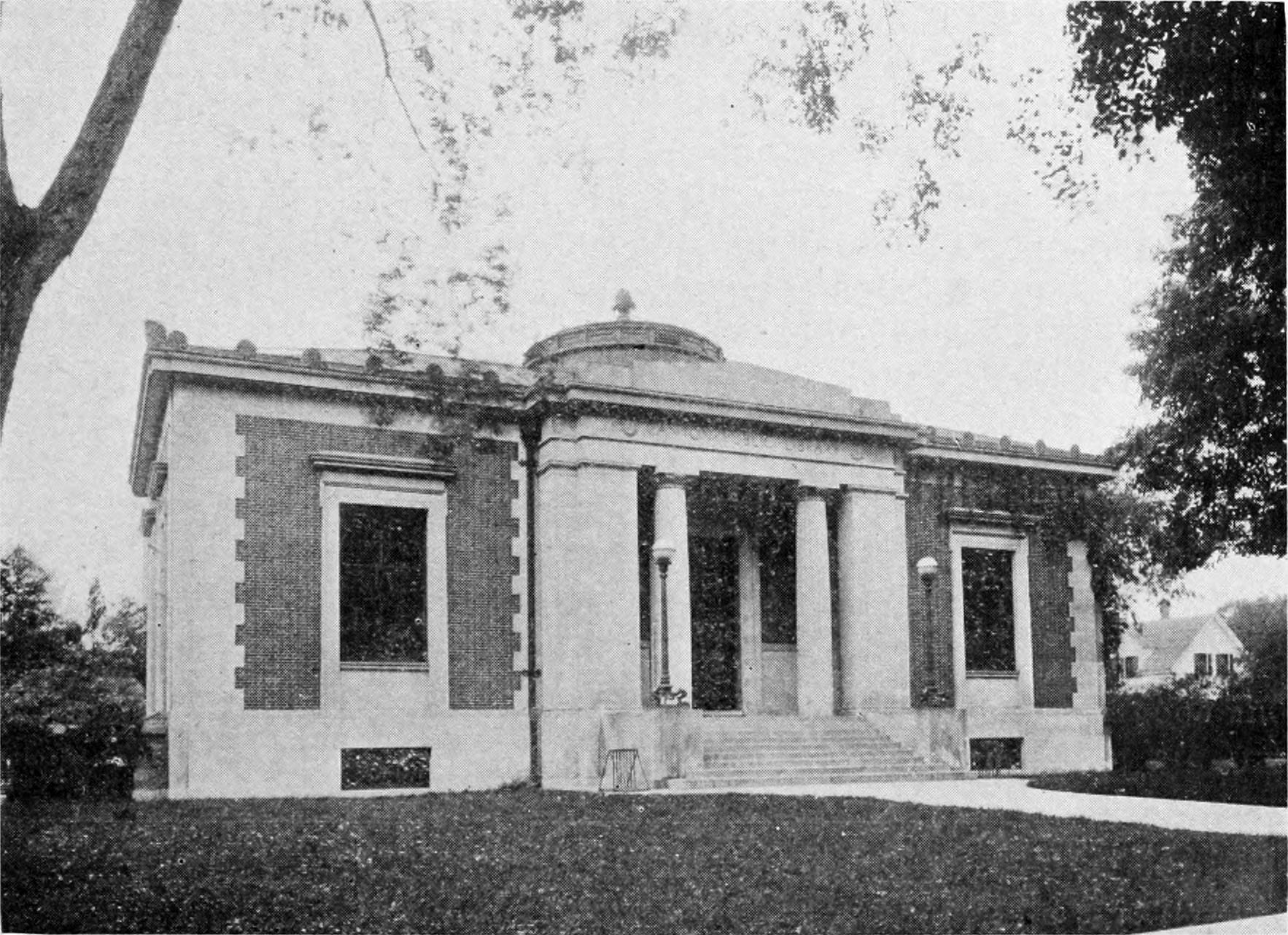
Canton Public Library, Canton, Massachusetts, 1901-02.

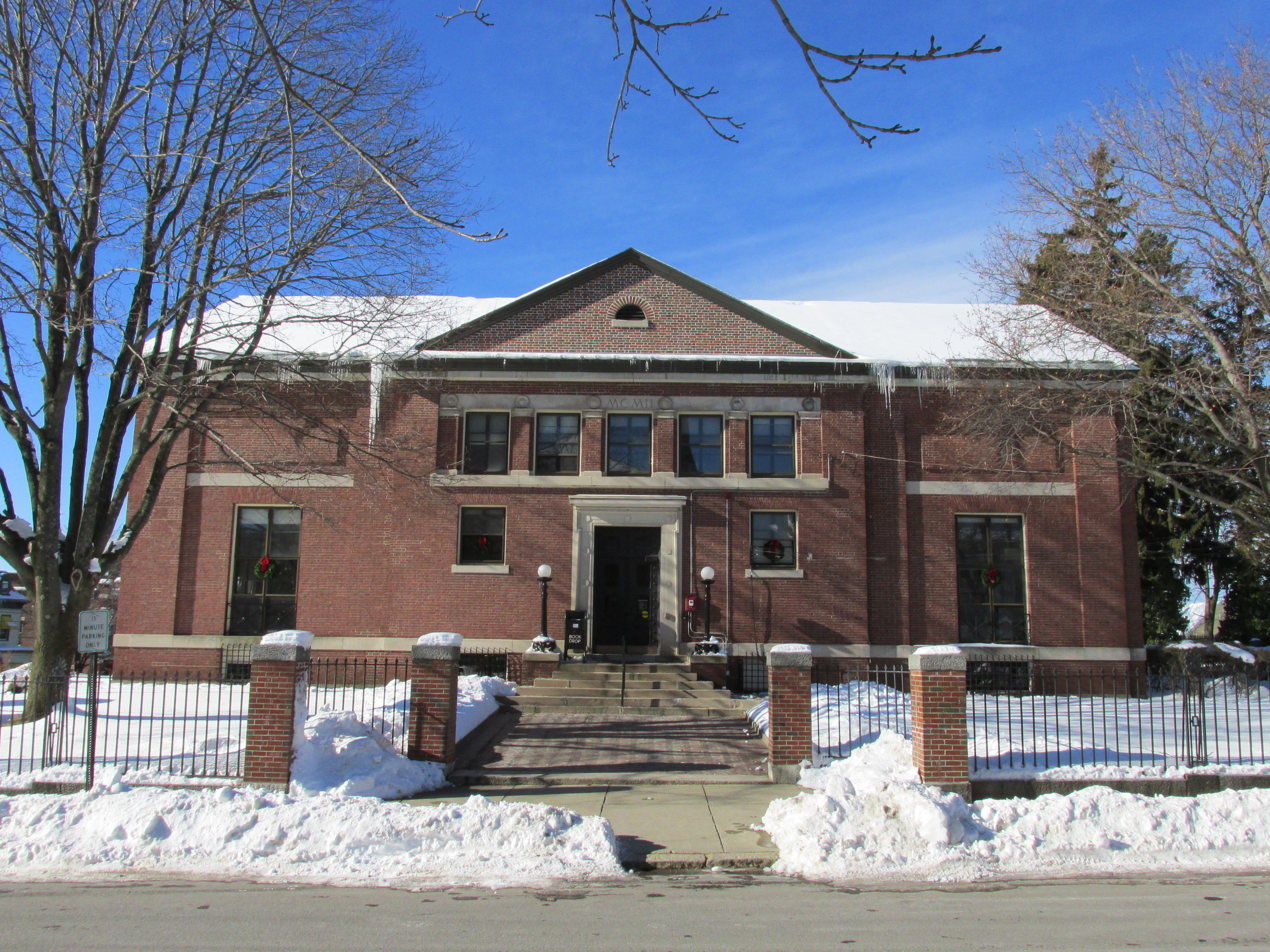
Bigelow Free Public Library, Clinton, Massachusetts, 1902-03.

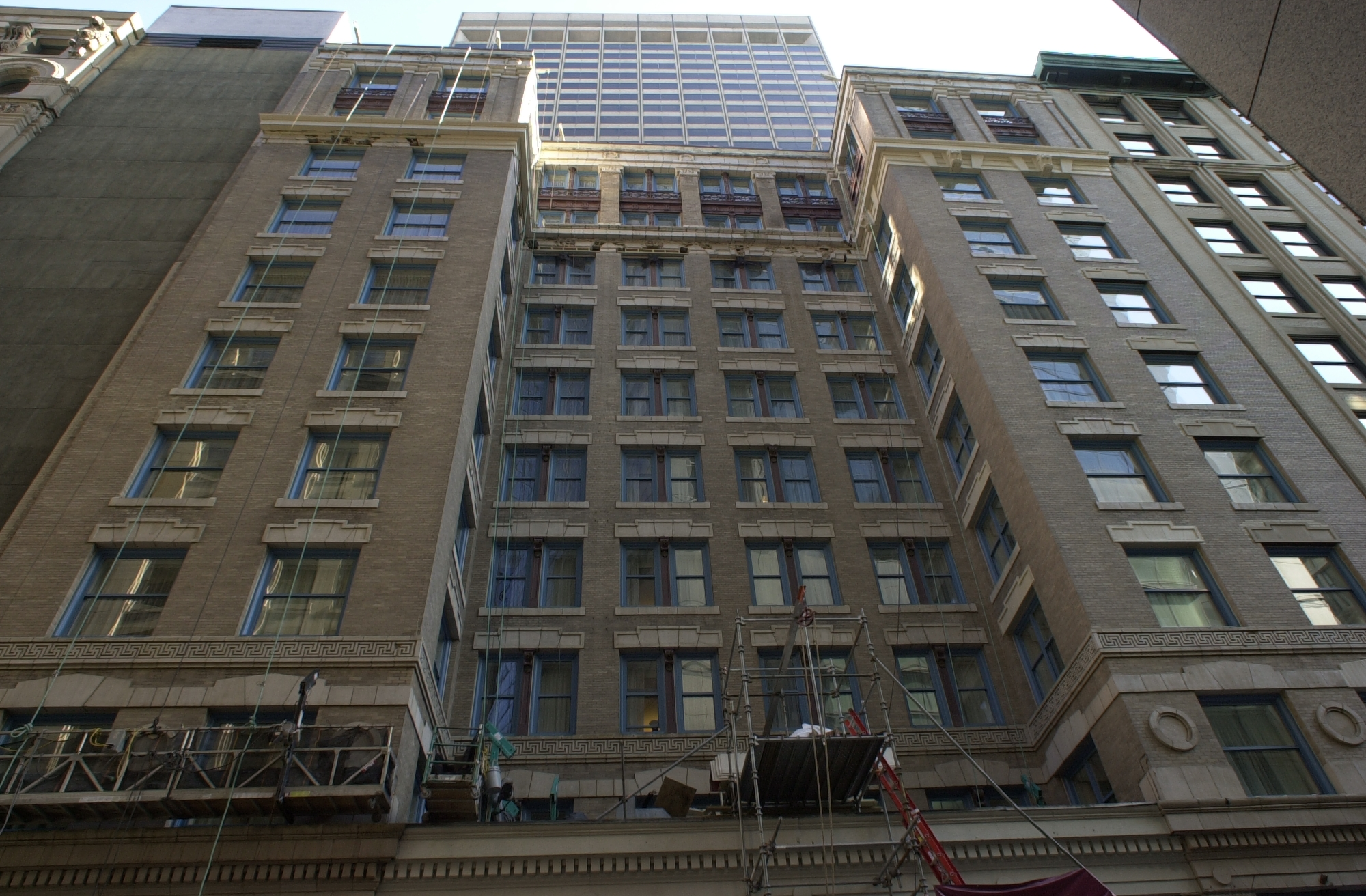
Compton Building, Boston, Massachusetts, 1902-03.

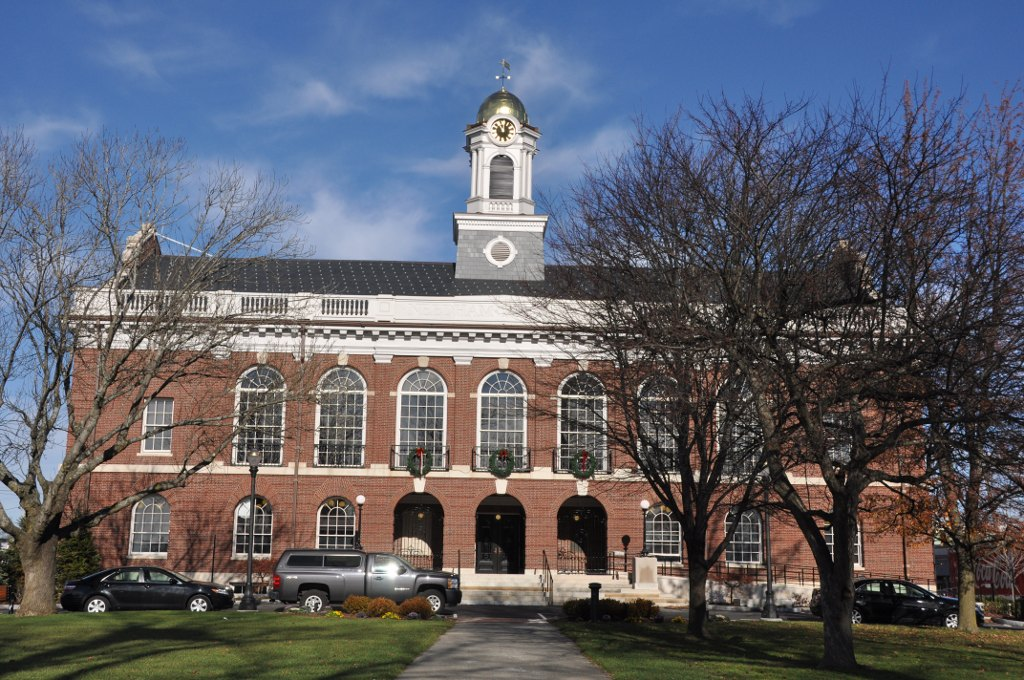
Needham Town Hall, Needham, Massachusetts, 1902-03.

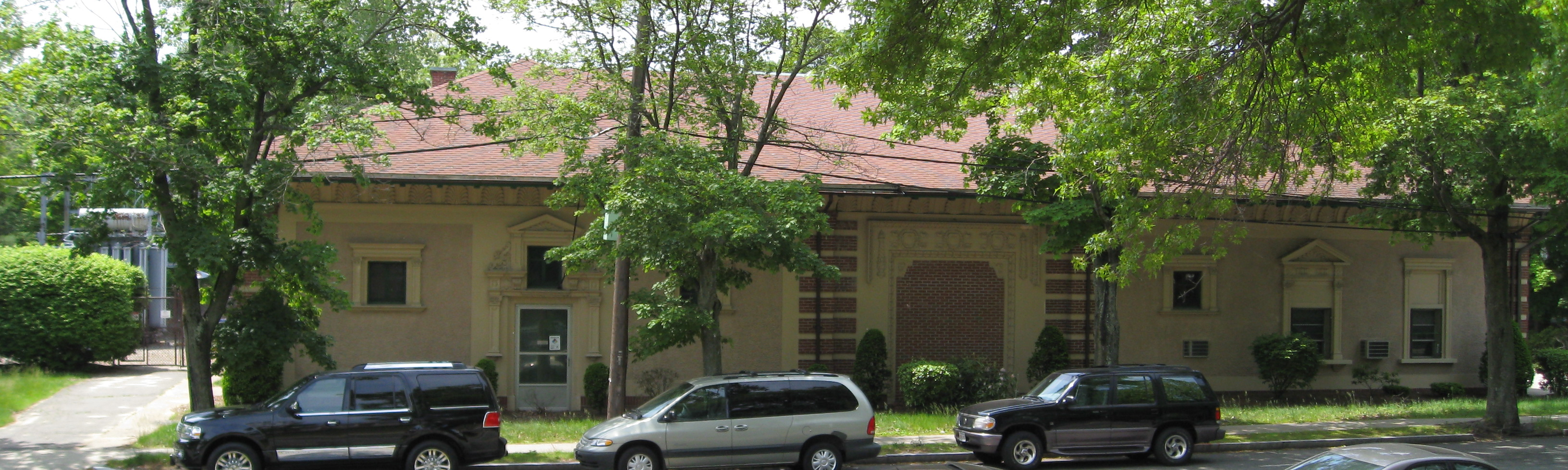
Substation, Edison Electric Illuminating Company of Boston, Newton, Massachusetts, 1904.

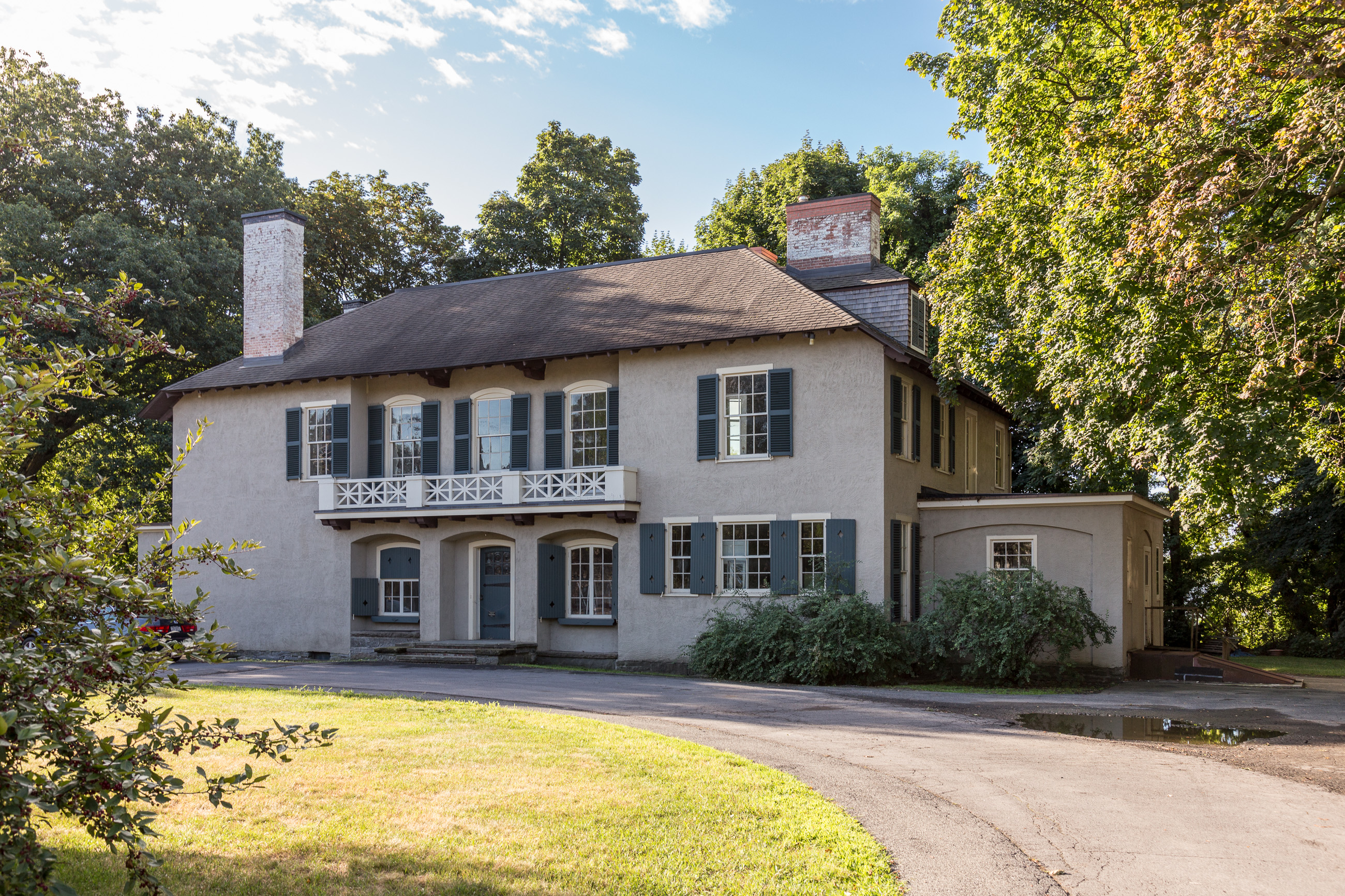
Hoopes_House, Glen Falls, New York, 1904

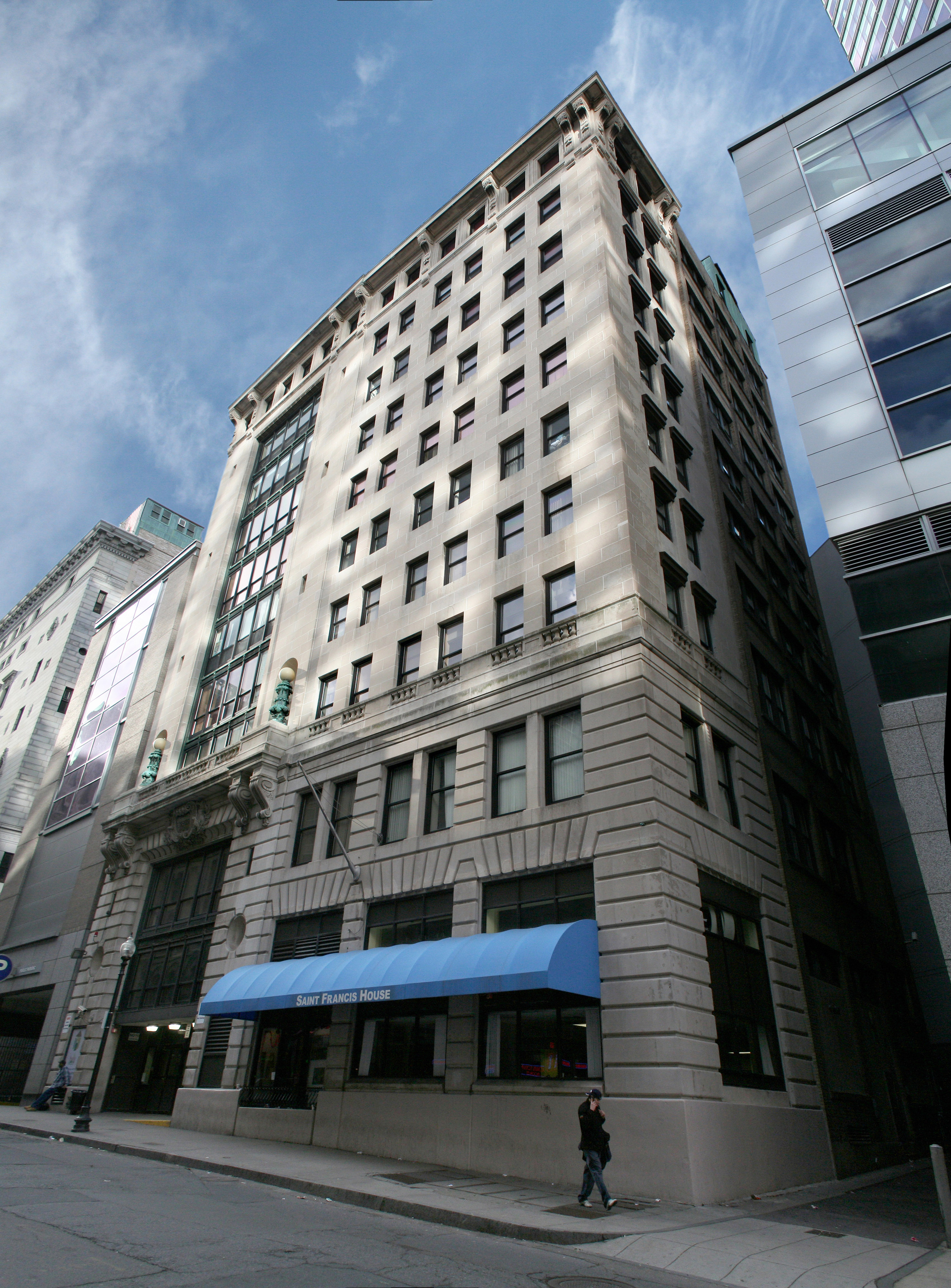
Boston Edison Electric Illuminating Company Building, Boston, Massachusetts, 1906 and 1922.

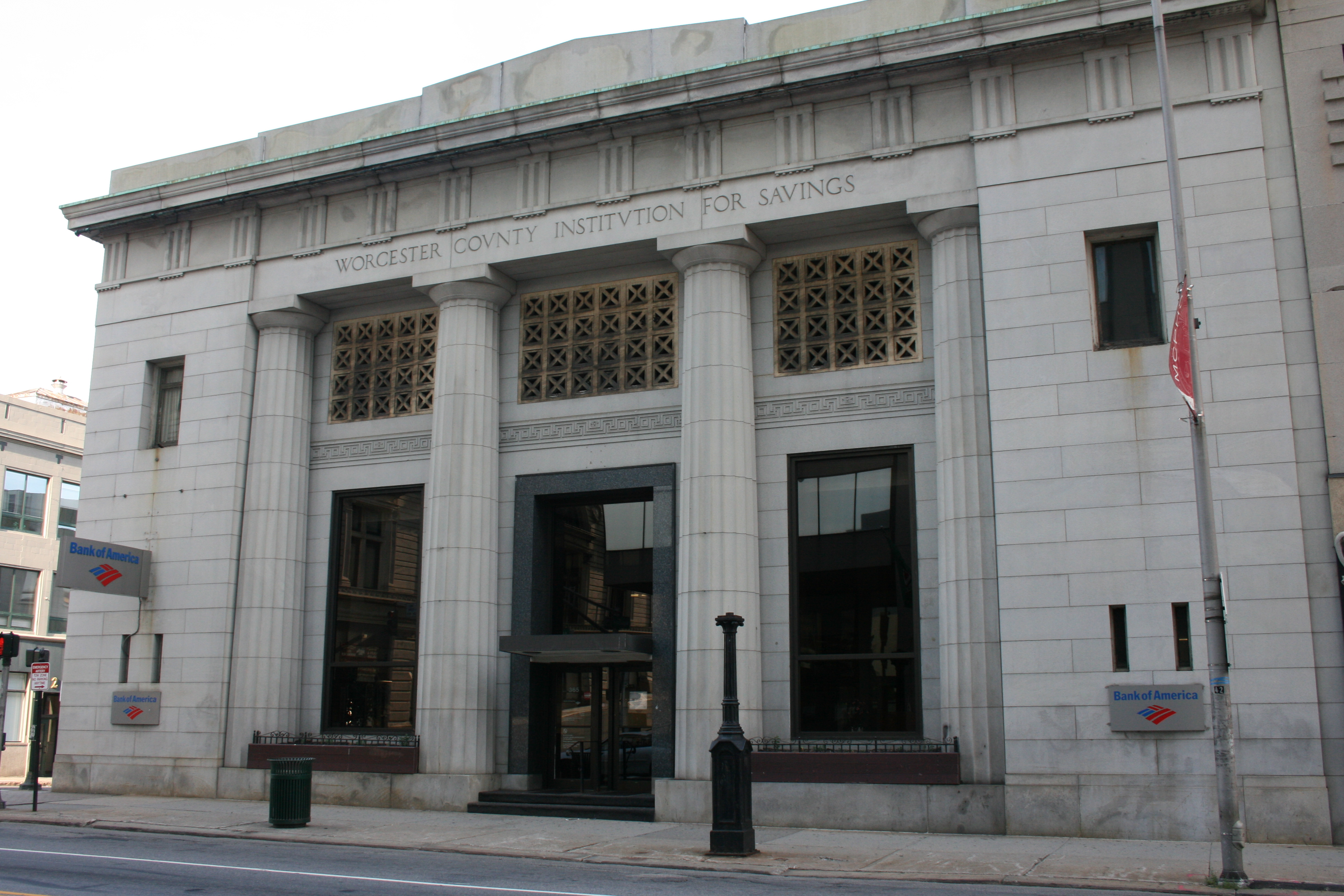
Worcester County Institution for Savings Building, Worcester, Massachusetts, 1906.

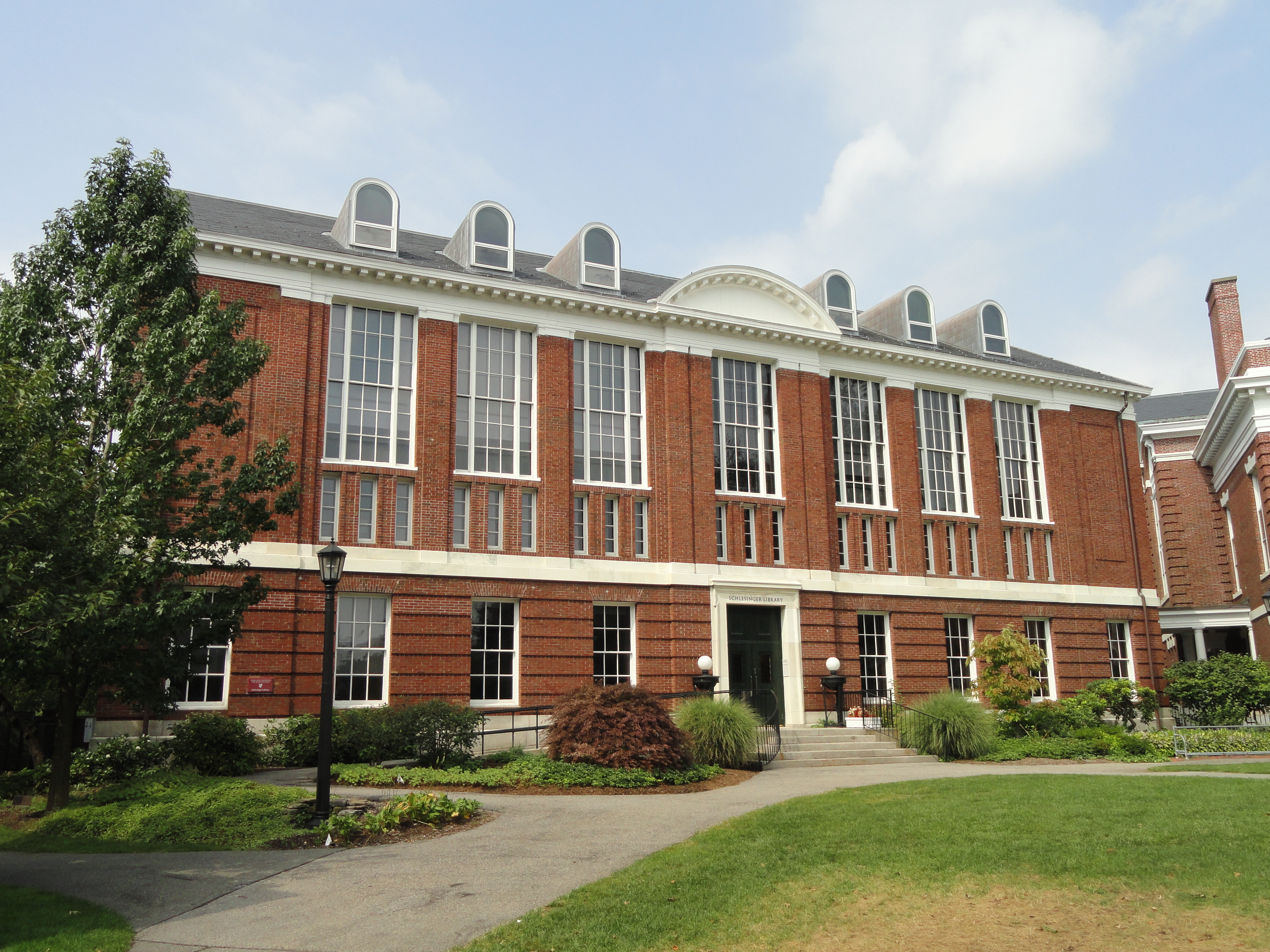
Schlesinger Library, Radcliffe College, Cambridge, Massachusetts, 1907.

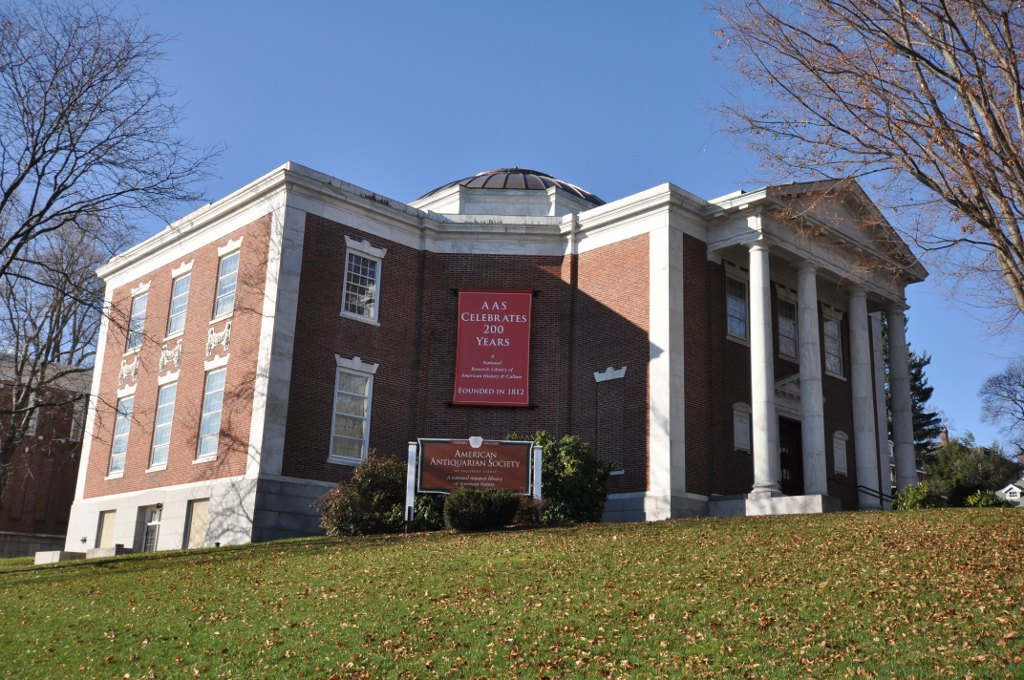
American Antiquarian Society, Worcester, Massachusetts, 1909-10.

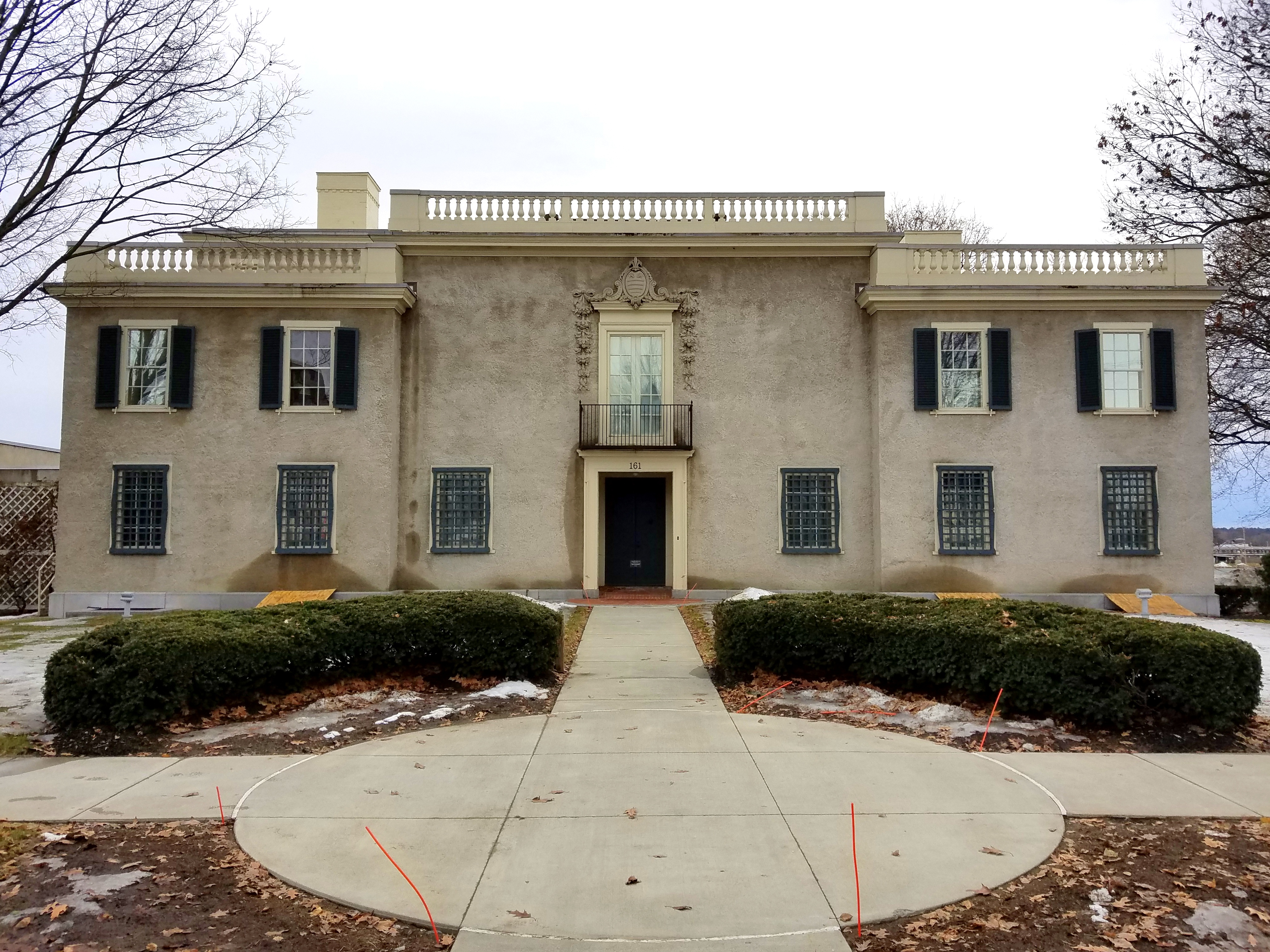
Hyde House, Glens Falls, New York, 1910-11

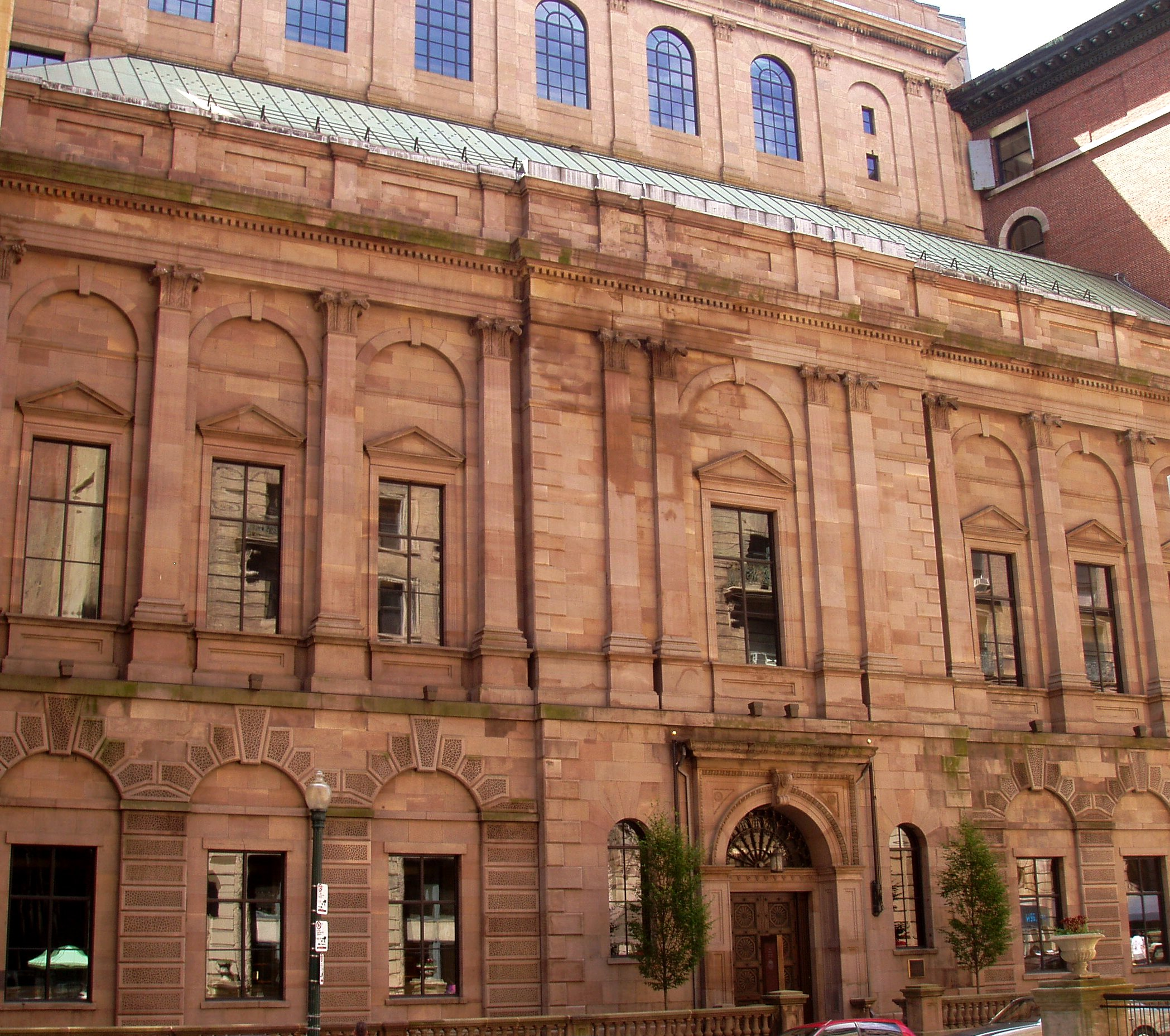
Penthouse and rear additions, Boston Athenæum, Boston, Massachusetts, 1913-14.

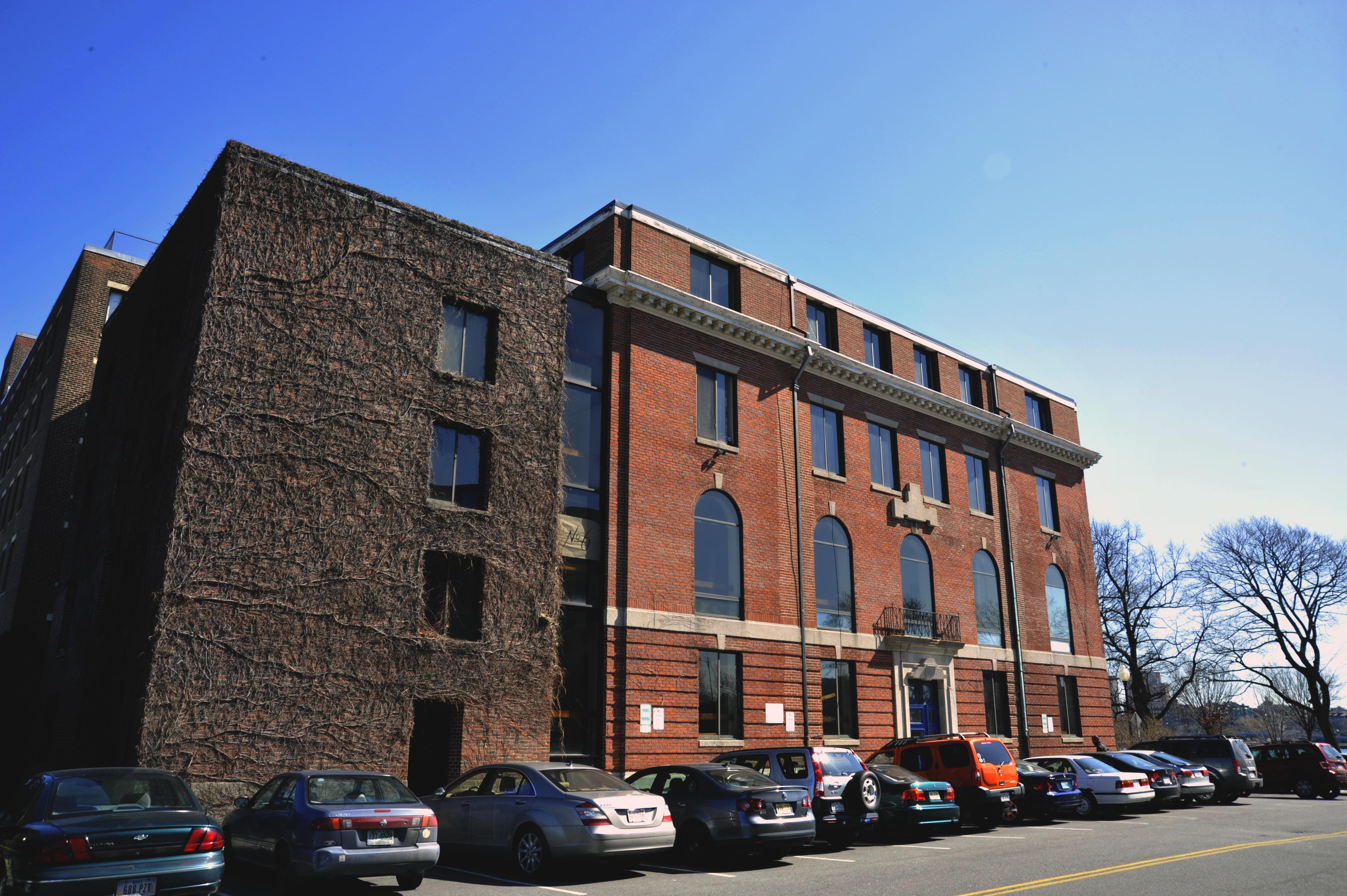
Number Six Club, Cambridge, Massachusetts, 1913.

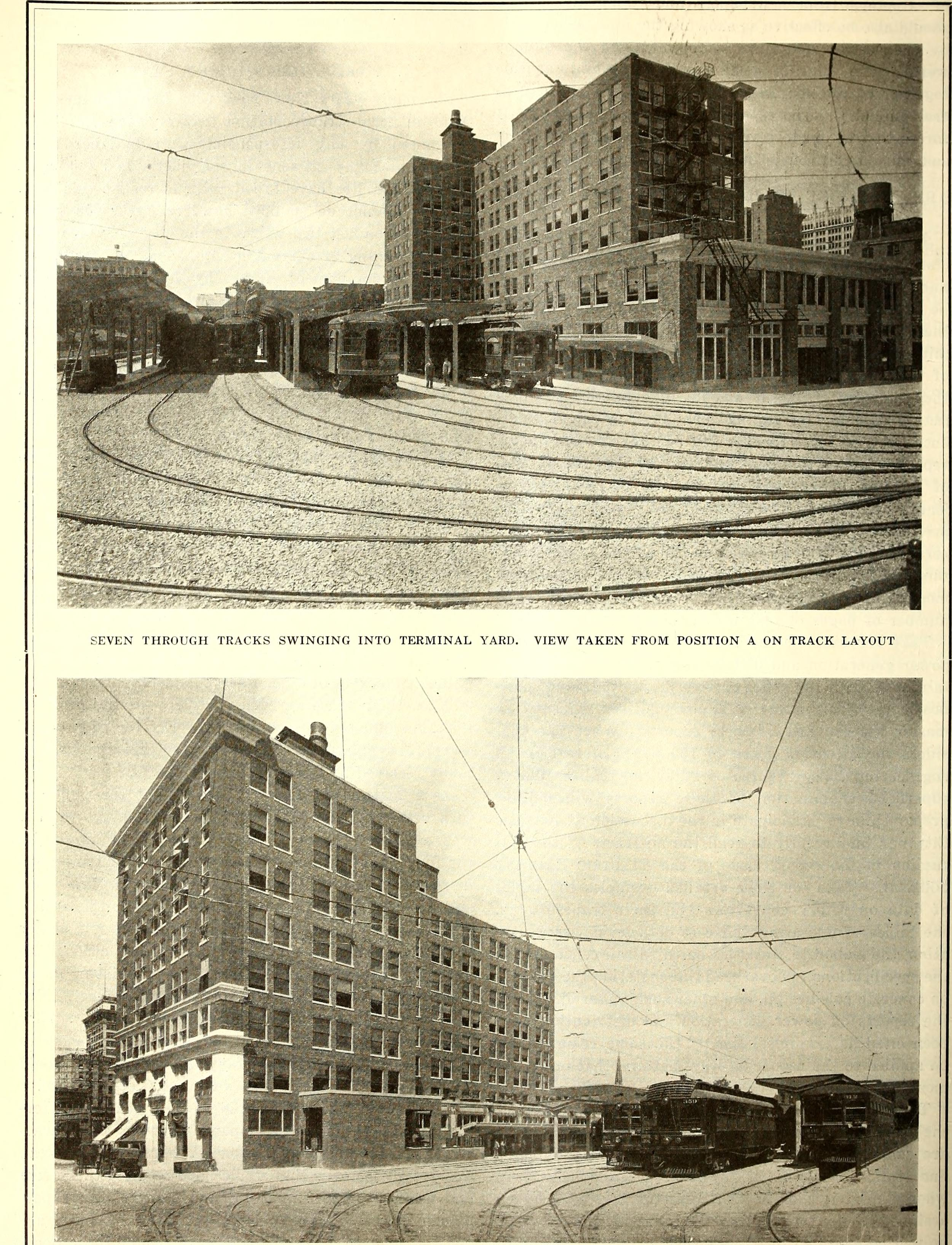
Interurban Building, Dallas, Texas, 1916.

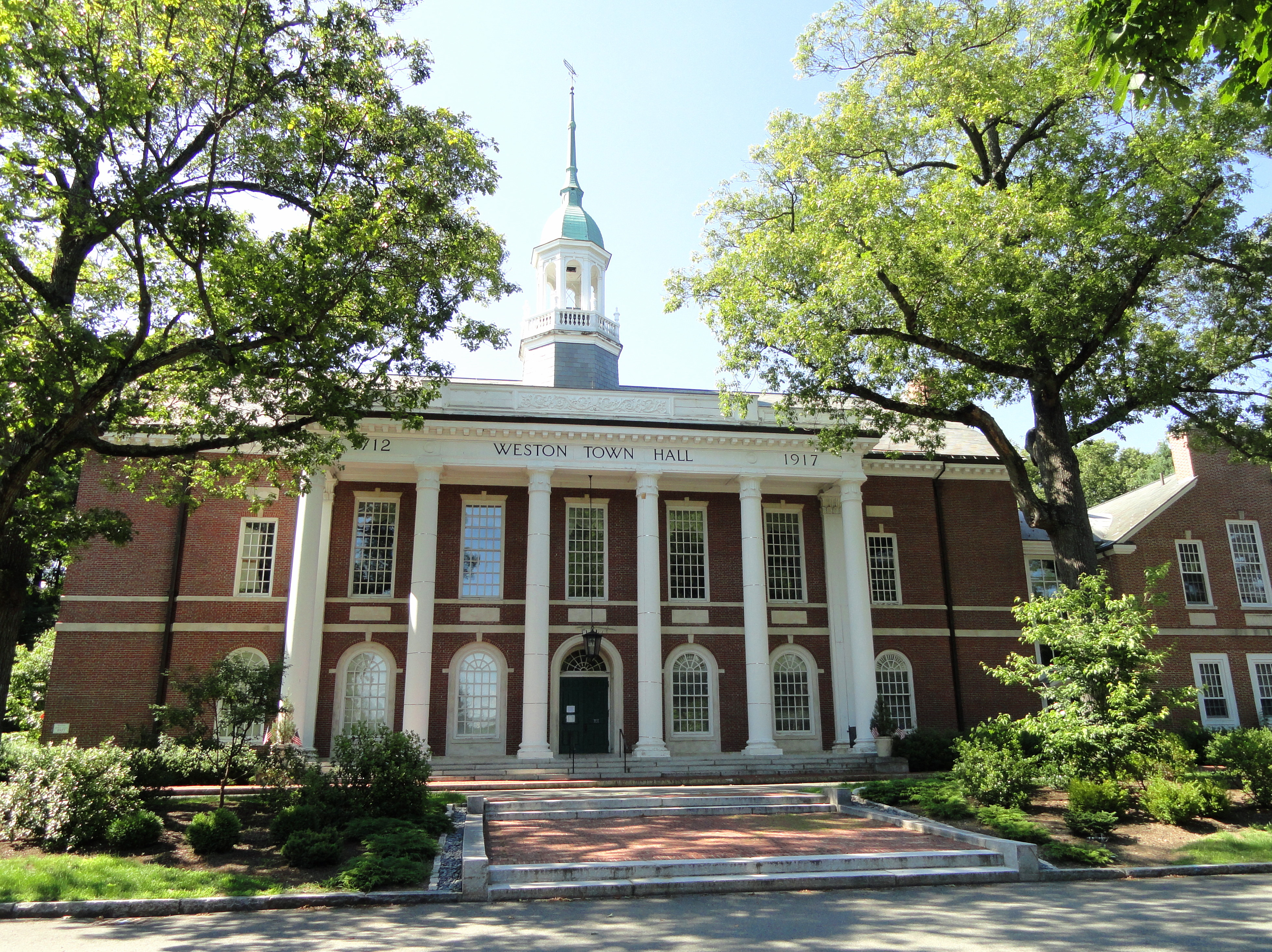
Weston Town Hall, Weston, Massachusetts, 1916-17.

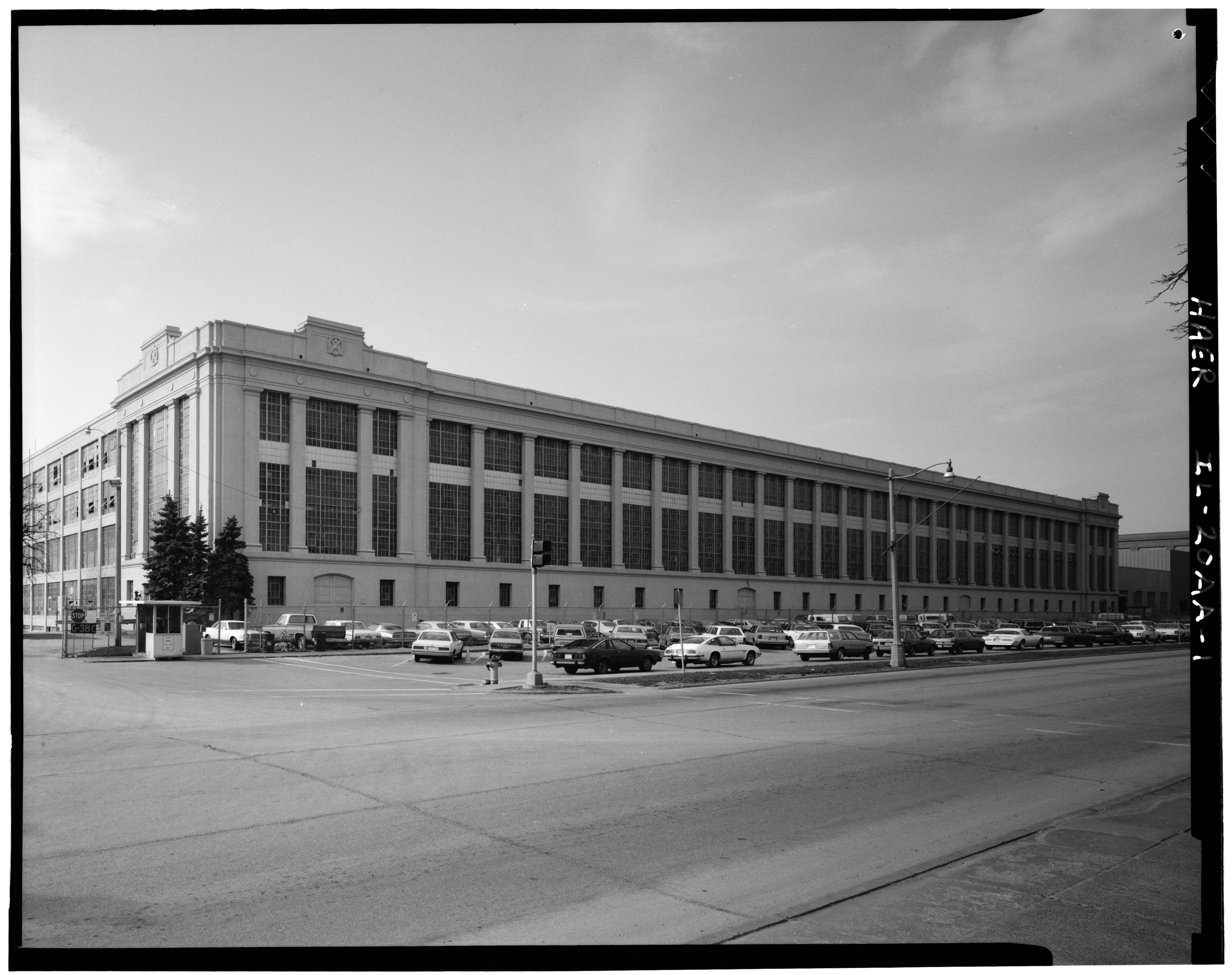
Building No. 220, Rock Island Arsenal, Rock Island, Illinois, 1917-18.

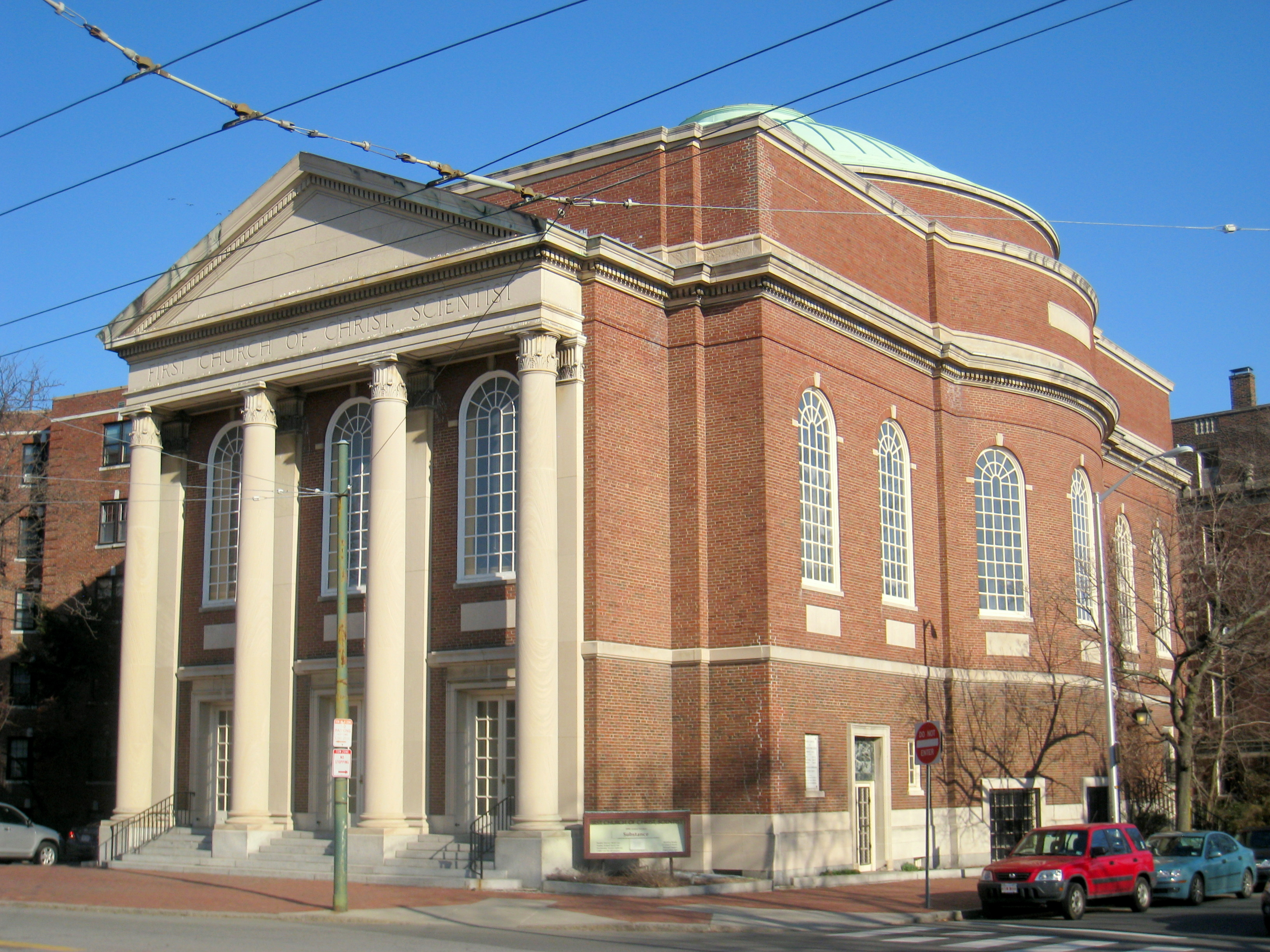
First Church of Christ, Scientist, Cambridge, Massachusetts, 1923-24 and 1929-30.
