= Compton Building =

- U.S. National Register of Historic Places
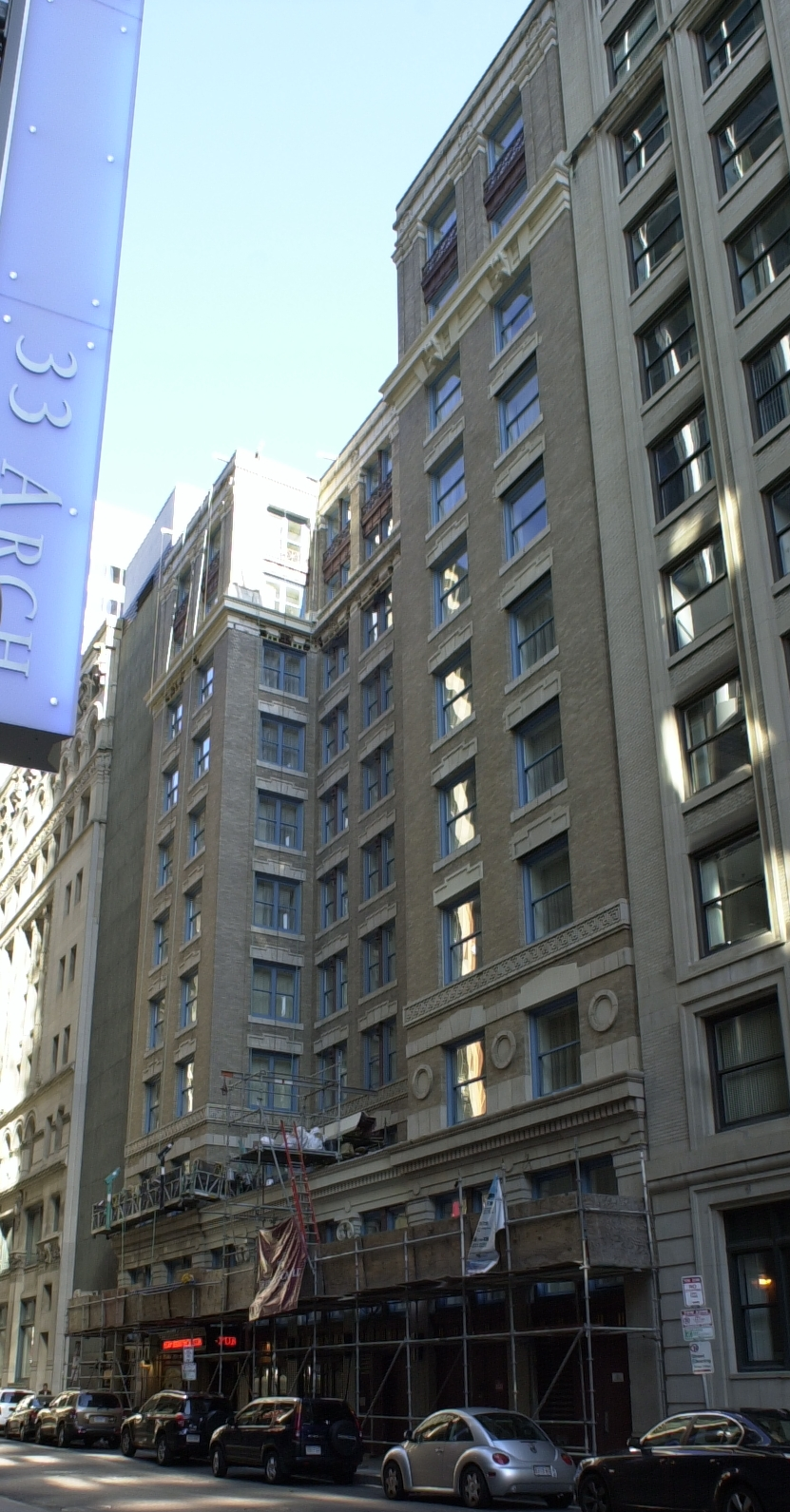

- Location within Boston Location within Massachusetts Location within the United States
- Location: 159, 161-175 Devonshire St., 18-20 Arch St., Boston, Massachusetts
- Coordinates: 42°21′22.4″N 71°3′27.3″W
- Area: less than one acre
- Built: 1902
- Architect: Winslow and Bigelow
- Architectural style: Classical Revival
- NRHP reference No.: 08001284
- Added to NRHP: December 31, 2008

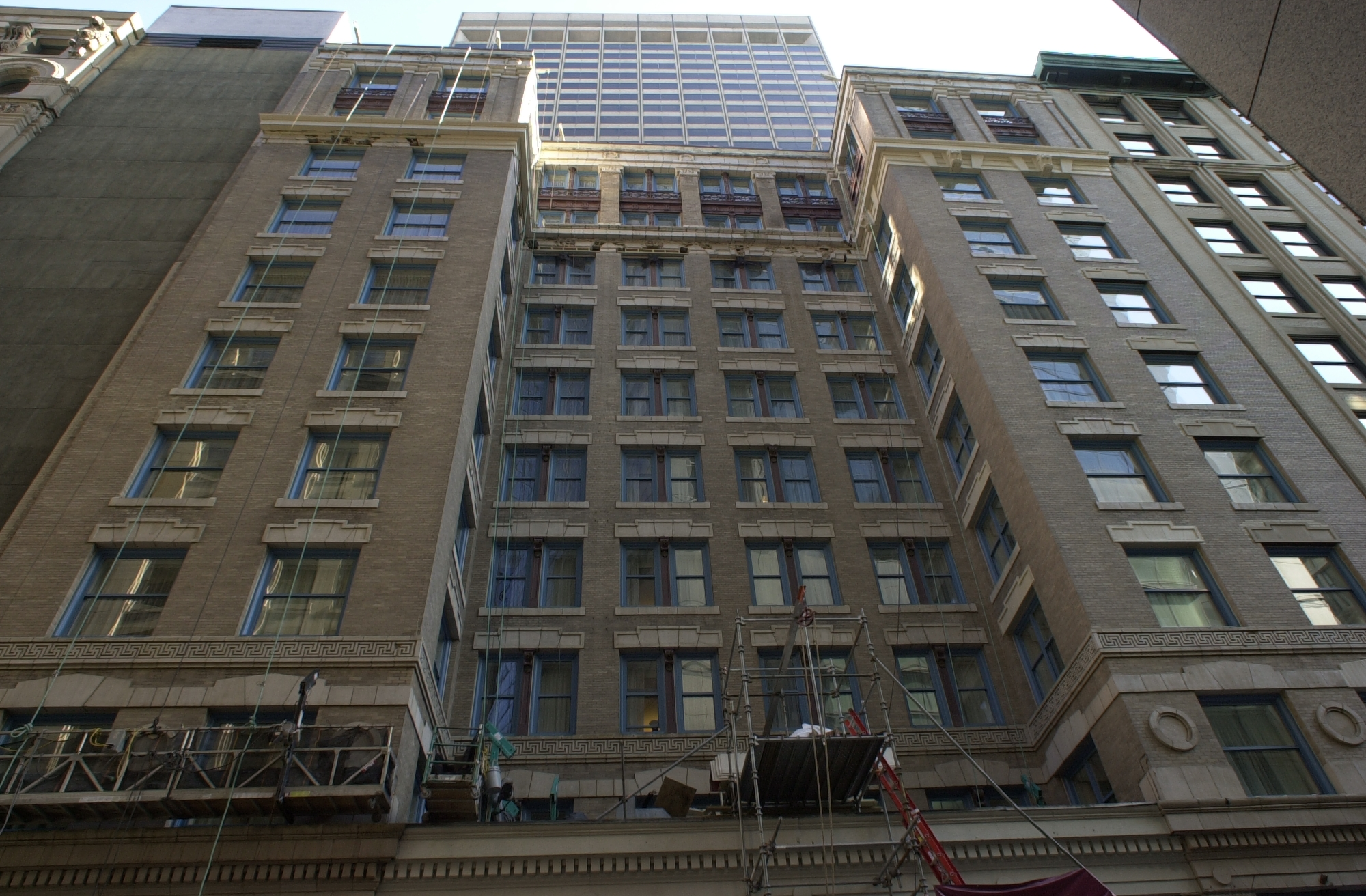
View from Arch Street

The Compton Building is a historic building at 159, 161-175 Devonshire Street and 18-20 Arch Street in Boston, Massachusetts. The eleven-story Classical Revival office tower was built in 1902–03 to a design by Henry Forbes Bigelow of Winslow & Bigelow, and is a well-preserved example of a Chicago-style steel-framed skyscraper. The building was listed on the National Register of Historic Places in 2008.

== Description and history ==
The Compton Building is located in Boston's Financial District, occupying a roughly rectangular parcel between Devonshire and Arch Streets south of Milk Street. It is connected by a late 20th-century connector to the International Trust Company Building, which stands facing Milk Street to the north. It is eleven stories in height, with a steel frame and exterior finished in stone. Its main facade faces Devonshire Street, and features an architectural plan typical of early 20th-century buildings. The lower two floors serve as a stylistic base, while the third through ninth floors have a largely repeated array of windows. The upper two floors form a sort of stylist cap for the building, featuring a level of detail similar to the bottom floors. The Arch Street facade has a similar arrangement, except that there is a recessed well in the upper middle bays, providing additional light to those floors.

The building was constructed in 1902–03 to a design by Henry Forbes Bigelow of Winslow & Bigelow to meet burgeoning demand for office space in the Financial District, with 65% of its space allocated to interested parties prior to construction. Its early tenants including a wide variety of businesses, including offices of manufacturers, insurance companies, and attorneys. The ground floor eventually became a more retail-oriented space, having had a long use as a showroom for manufacturing tenants. By the early 1960s the building was largely vacant, reflecting declining demand. In 1961, the building was under common ownership with the International Trust Company Building, and an older intervening 5-story structure. The latter was demolished c. 1981, and in its place a structure was built providing modern elevators and emergency egress facilities to both buildings. The Compton Building was afterward converted into a hotel, and now houses the Club Quarters Hotel, with a restaurant on the ground floor.

== See also ==
- National Register of Historic Places listings in northern Boston, Massachusetts
