= International Trust Company Building =

- U.S. National Register of Historic Places
- Boston Landmark
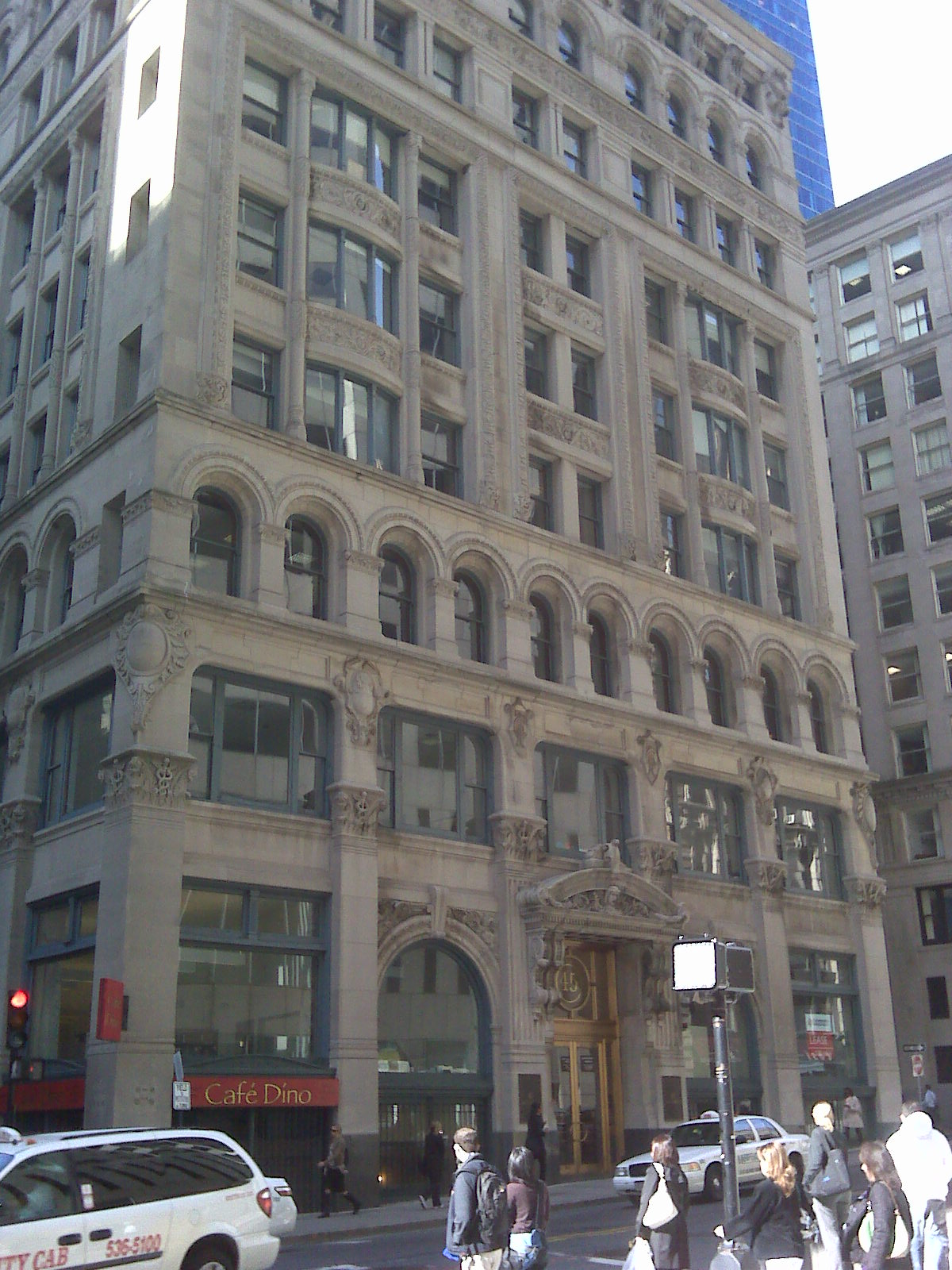
- International Trust Company Building as it appeared in 2009

- Location within Boston Location within Massachusetts Location within the United States
- Location: Boston, Massachusetts
- Coordinates: 42°21′23″N 71°3′29″W
- Area: less than one acre
- Built: 1893
- Architect: William Gibbons Preston, Max Bachman
- Architectural style: Beaux Arts
- NRHP reference No.: 79000369

Significant dates
- Added to NRHP: September 10, 1979
- Designated BOSL: April 25, 1978

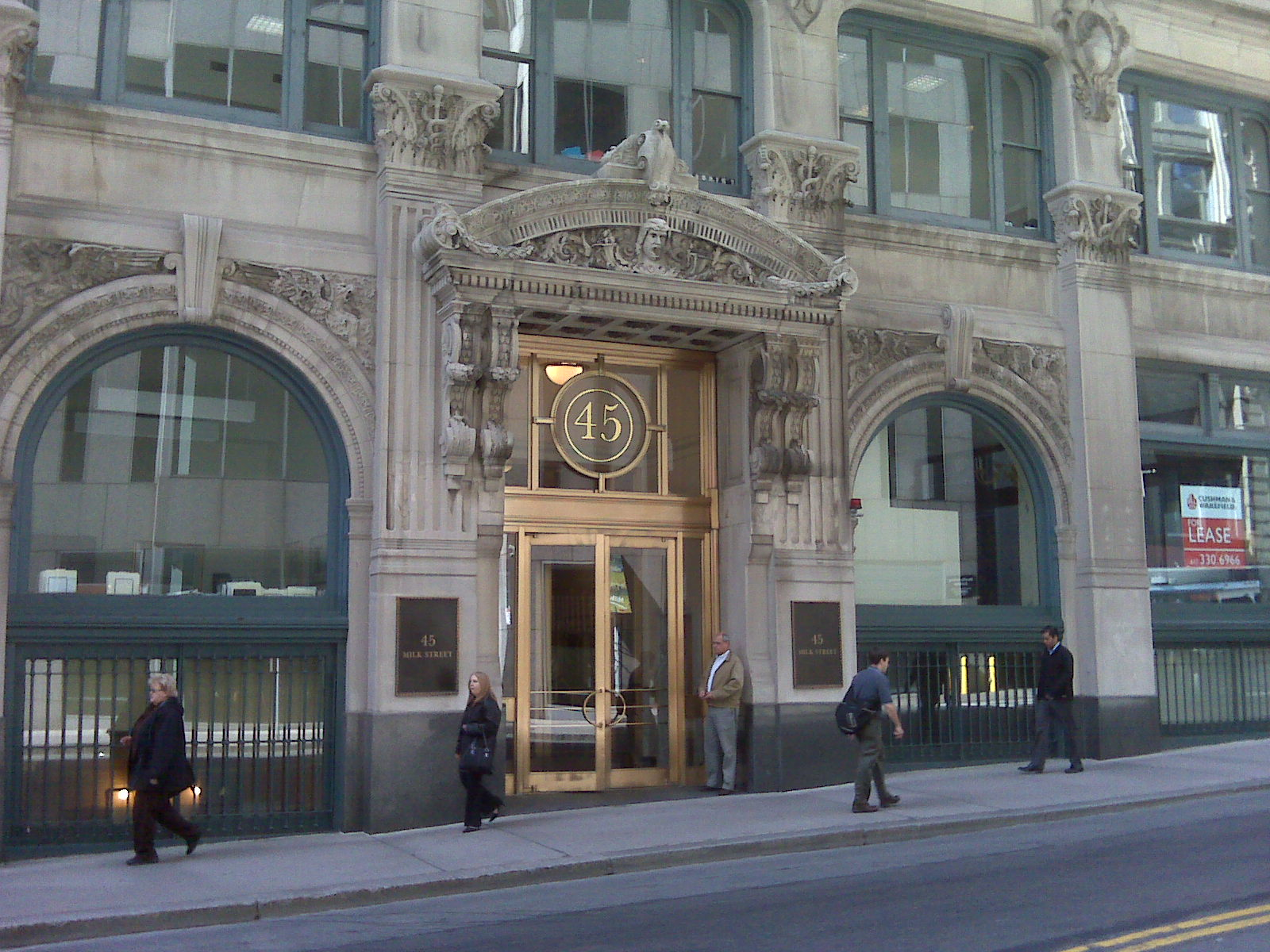
Entrance to the International Trust Company Building

The International Trust Company Building is an historic office building at 39-47 Milk Street in Boston, Massachusetts. The nine-story masonry-clad building was built in 1892–93 to a design by William Gibbons Preston, a prominent local architect. It is an early Boston example of the Beaux Arts style, and is structurally an early prototype of the use of skeleton framing. The building was designated a Boston Landmark by the Boston Landmarks Commission in 1978, and was listed on the National Register of Historic Places in 1979.

== Description and history ==
The International Trust Company Building stands in Boston's Financial District, facing Milk Street and flanked on its sides by Arch and Devonshire Streets. To its south is the Compton Building, to which it was at one time joined by internal connections. It is nine stories in height, with a frame of load-bearing concrete piers and floors supported by steel I-beams. Its exterior is finished in Indiana limestone and Quincy granite, and features a variety of elaborate details typical of the Beaux Arts style. Also featured on the exterior are statues designed by sculptor Max Bachman.

The International Trust Company was founded in 1879, and grew rapidly to become one of New England's largest banks. Originally housed in a five-story building on this site, it hired Boston architect William Gibbons Preston to design a substantial enlargement. The resulting building was three bays wide, and faced Arch Street. Continued growth prompted to company to again hire Preston to enlarge it in 1906, resulting in the present appearance with the main facade facing Milk Street. The company's independent existence ended in the 1920s when it merged with the First National Bank of Boston.

It was connected by internal connections to the adjacent Compton Building in 1961, when the two buildings were under common ownership, and had been vacant since 1973 when it was nominated to the National Register of Historic Places in 1979.

== See also ==
- National Register of Historic Places listings in northern Boston, Massachusetts
