= Hoopes House =

Historic house in New York, United States

- U.S. National Register of Historic Places
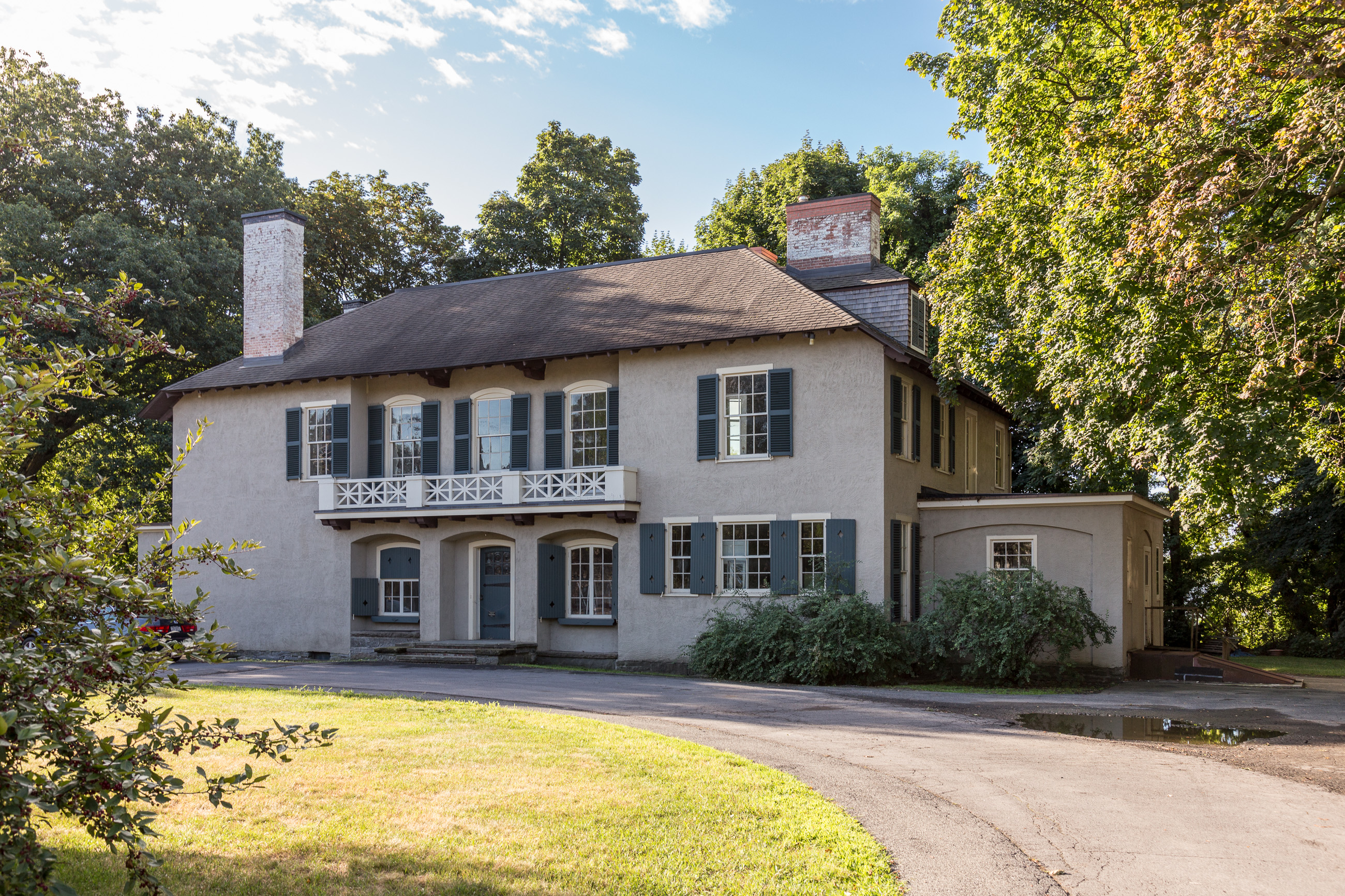

- Location within New York Location within the United States
- Location: 153 Warren St., Glens Falls, New York
- Coordinates: 43°18′37″N 73°38′7″W
- Area: 0.6 acres (0.24 ha)
- Built: 1904
- Architect: Bigelow, Henry Forbes; Rhinelander, H. E.
- Architectural style: Dutch Colonial Revival
- MPS: Bigelow, Henry Forbes, Buildings TR
- NRHP reference No.: 84003348
- Added to NRHP: September 29, 1984

Hoopes House is a historic home located at Glens Falls, Warren County, New York. Designed by Boston architect Henry Forbes Bigelow, it was built in 1904 and is a rectangular, two story, stucco residence covered by a hipped roof sheathed with wood shingles. It features Dutch Colonial Revival style design elements. It was the home of Mary Pruyn Hoopes, the sister of Charlotte Pruyn Hyde. Charlotte Hyde was the founder of The Hyde Collection, an art museum adjacent to Hoopes House. The Hyde Collection owns Hoopes House.

It was added to the National Register of Historic Places in 1984.

== See also ==
- National Register of Historic Places listings in Warren County, New York
