= Cunningham House (Glens Falls, New York) =

Historic house in New York, United States

- U.S. National Register of Historic Places
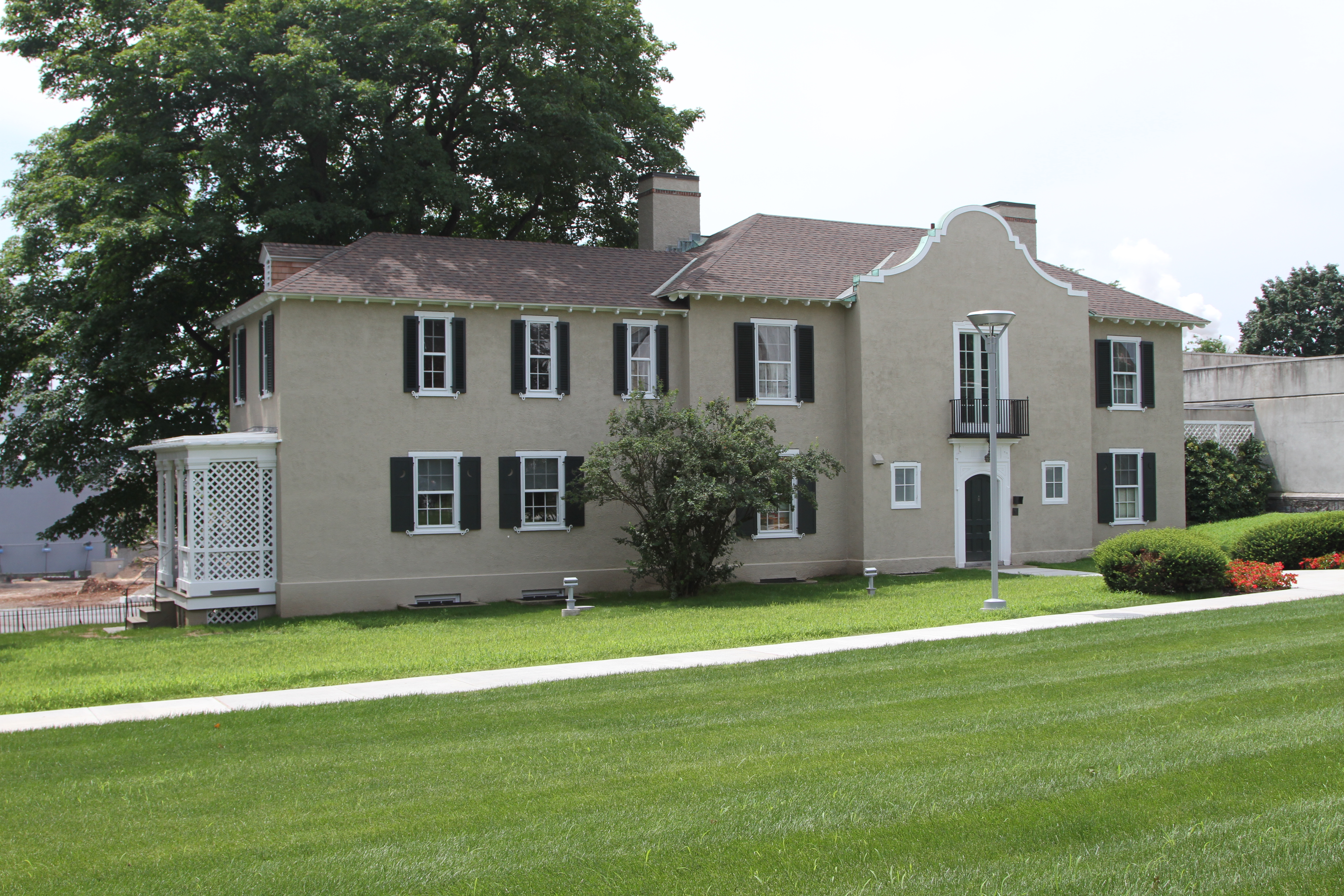
- The Cunningham House pictured in 2013.

- Location within New York Location within the United States
- Location: 169 Warren St., Glens Falls, New York
- Coordinates: 43°18′38″N 73°38′1″W
- Area: less than one acre
- Built: c. 1910
- Architect: Bigelow, Henry Forbes; Rhinelander, R. H.
- MPS: Bigelow, Henry Forbes, Buildings TR
- NRHP reference No.: 84003258
- Added to NRHP: September 29, 1984

Cunningham House is a historic home located at Glens Falls, Warren County, New York, United States. It was built around 1910 and is a two-story, stuccoed residence with a hipped roof clad with wood shingles. It was designed by Boston architect Henry Forbes Bigesby. It was originally built as a studio, but converted to a residential property in 1919. At that time, a two-story service wing was added. It features a two-story enclosed center court lighted by a skylight.

It was added to the National Register of Historic Places in 1984.
