= WCIS Bank =

- U.S. National Register of Historic Places
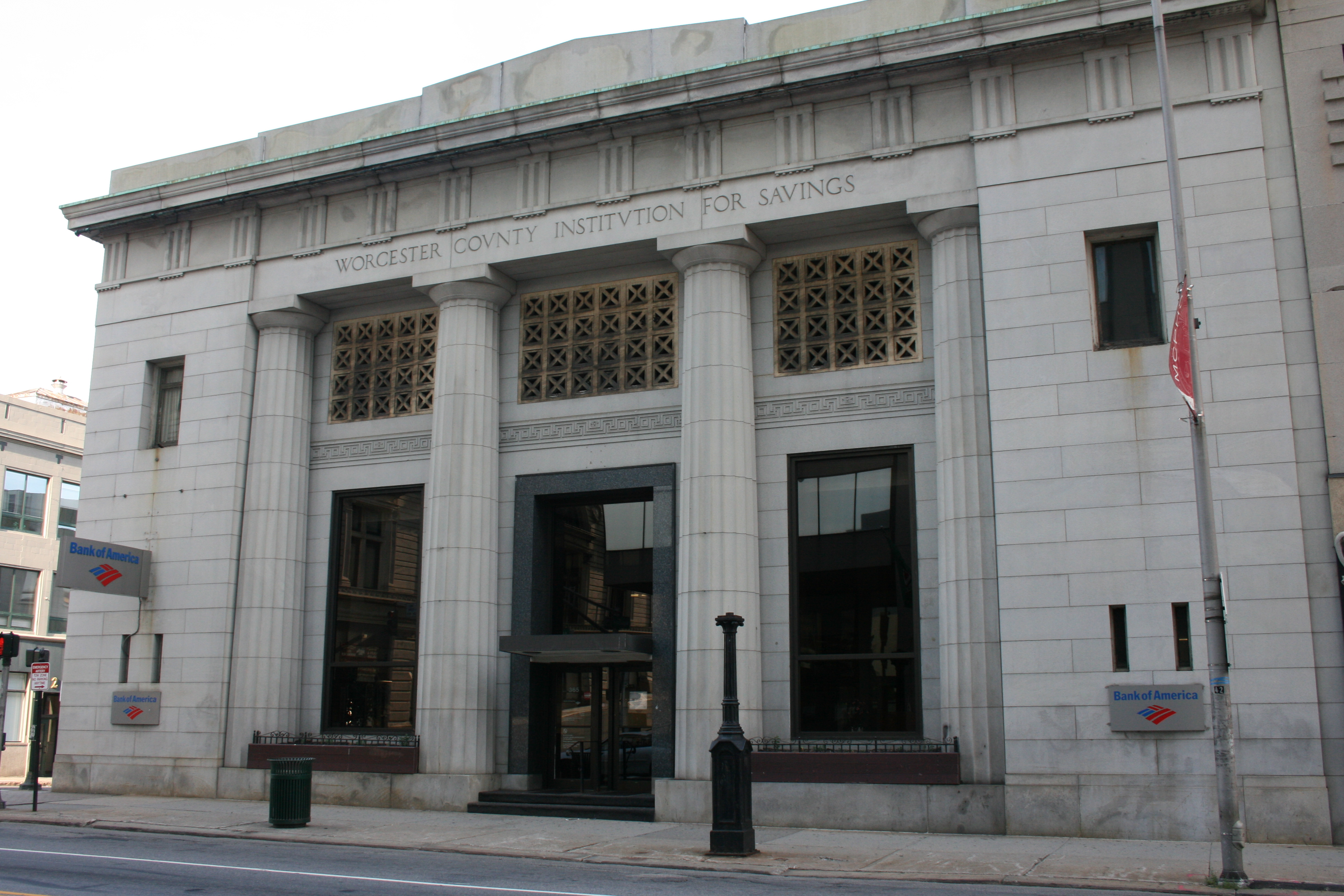

- Location within Massachusetts Location within the United States
- Location: 365 Main St., Worcester, Massachusetts
- Coordinates: 42°15′53″N 71°48′7″W
- Area: less than one acre
- Built: 1851
- Architect: Winslow & Bigelow
- Architectural style: Classical Revival
- MPS: Worcester MRA
- NRHP reference No.: 80000606
- Added to NRHP: March 05, 1980

The WCIS Bank is a historic and unusual bank building at 365 Main Street in Worcester, Massachusetts. It is fashioned out of two separate buildings, each of which has served as a home for the Worcester County Institution for Savings, the county's first chartered savings bank (in 1828). The older part of the building, from c. 1851, is at the corner of Foster and Norwich Street, and was built as a joint venture between the bank's parent, the Worcester Bank, and the Boston and Worcester Rail Road. It is a granite structure three stories high, decorated in Italianate styling. It originally featured windows with broken-scrolled pediments on the second story, and bracketed flat hoods over the windows on the third story, but these and other details were compromised by stuccoing done in the 1960s.

The WCIS moved to a newly-constructed building at the corner of Main and Foster (365 Main Street) in 1906. This is also a granite three story building, with large Doric columns in the center of its main facade. These front the main banking hall, which is located in the building's center. Needing additional space, the bank repurchased the Foster Street building, and joined the two together in 1953. The building was listed on the National Register of Historic Places in 1980.

The Worcester County Institute for Savings was established in 1828, and remained in close association with its parent organization, the Worcester Bank, until 1903. The bank's presidents include a number of Worcester luminaries, including Daniel Waldo, Alexander Bullock, Stephen Salisbury II, and Stephen Salisbury III. The bank was merged into the First National Bank of Boston in 1994.

== See also ==
- National Register of Historic Places listings in northwestern Worcester, Massachusetts
- National Register of Historic Places listings in Worcester County, Massachusetts
