= Rye Beach, New Hampshire =

Unincorporated community in New Hampshire, U.S.

Rye Beach
- Beach
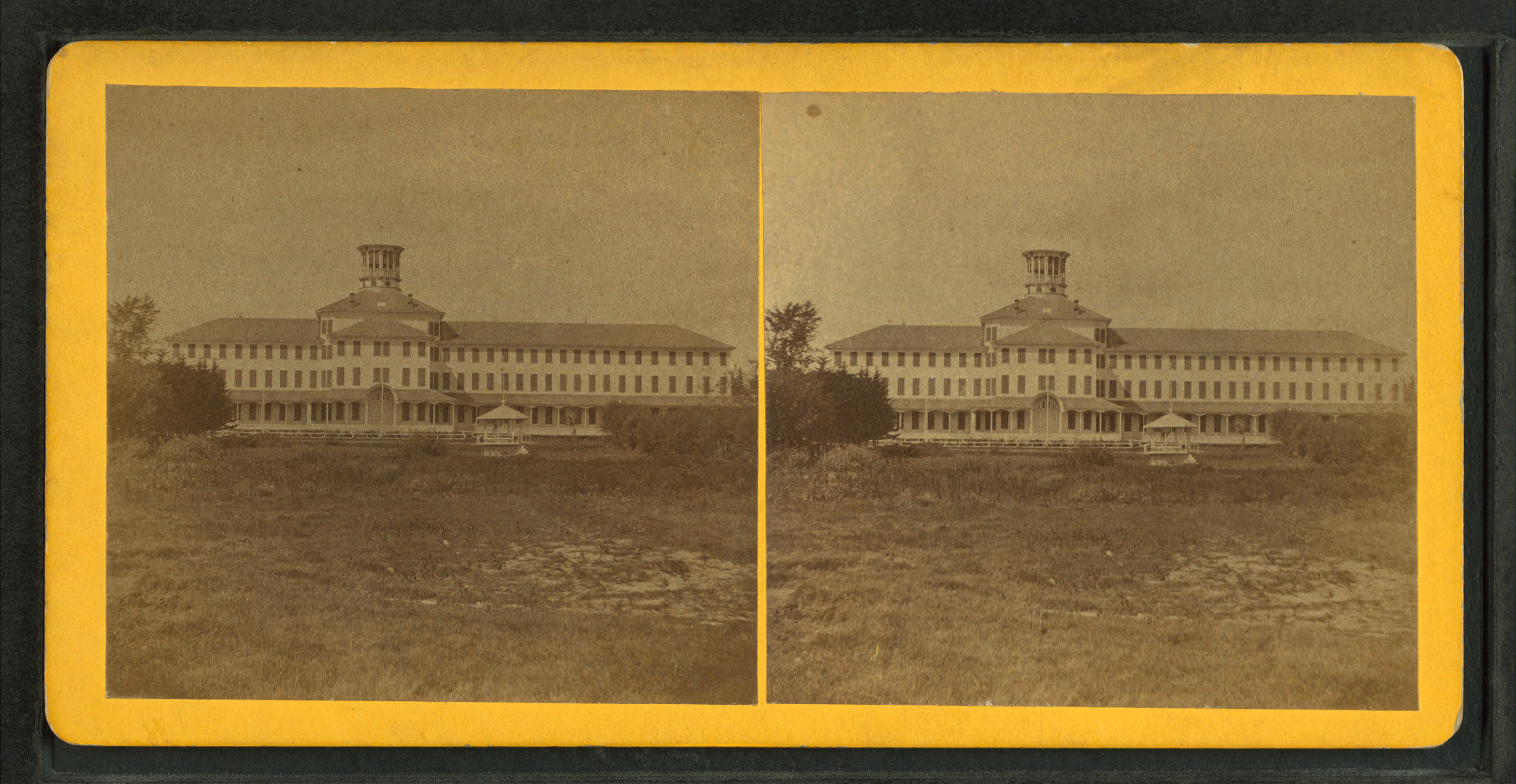
- Ocean House Ca. 1885

- Location within New Hampshire
- Coordinates: 42°58′36″N 70°45′55″W
- Location: Rye, New Hampshire

Dimensions
  - Length: .5 miles (0.80 km)

Rye Beach is an unincorporated community along the Atlantic Ocean in Rye, New Hampshire, United States. It is located along New Hampshire Route 1A near the southern border of the town of Rye, directly south of Jenness State Beach and north of Little Boar's Head (in the neighboring town of North Hampton). Rye Beach has a separate ZIP code (03871) from the rest of the town of Rye.

== History ==
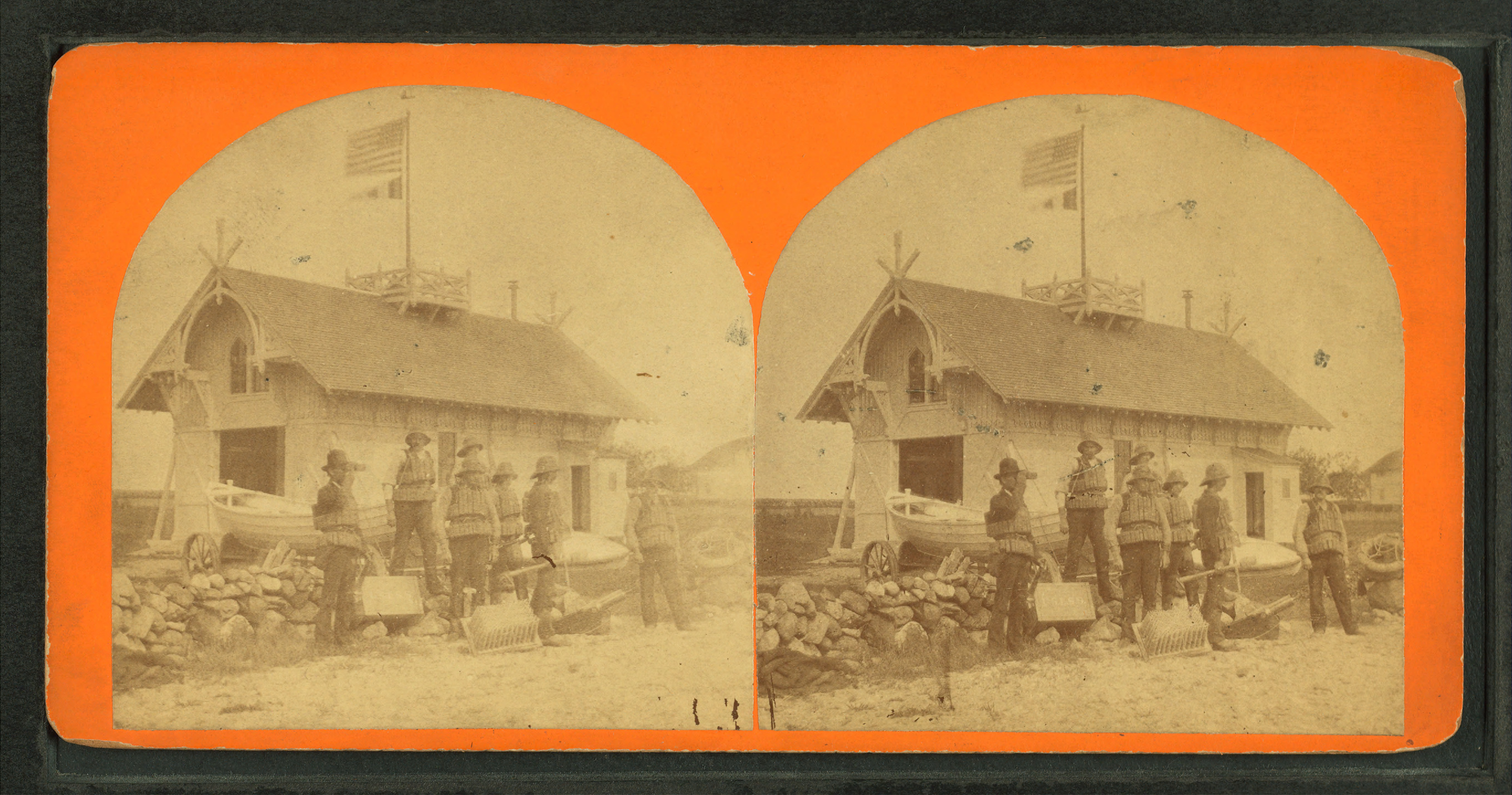
Rye Beach life saving station

The Ocean House, built in 1844, was owned by Job Jenness. The hostelry was financed by Stacy Nudd. It started out small and eventually reached four stories, with accommodations for 250 guests. By 1865, it was operated by John Colby Philbrick and was known as the Philbrick Hotel—a visit by Admiral David Farragut caused the building to be coined "Farragut House"; it was town down in the mid-1970s.

In 1874 and 1875, the Direct United States Cable Company's CS Faraday laid a transatlantic communications cable between Ballinskelligs, Ireland, and Rye Beach via Tor Bay, Nova Scotia, encompassing 3,104 miles (4,995 km). The company's communications station was located on Old Beach Road near the Rye Beach life saving station and beyond the Sunken Forests of New Hampshire. A New Hampshire historical marker, number 63 on New Hampshire Route 1A near Jenness State Beach, commemorates the communications station and nearby sunken forest.

== See also ==
- History of New Hampshire
- Seacoast Region (New Hampshire)
- Odiorne Point State Park
