= Sunken Forests of New Hampshire =

Two submerged forest remains

A petrified tree stump in a sunken forest of Rye, New Hampshire, viewed from above

The Sunken Forests of New Hampshire are two areas of petrified tree stumps submerged off the coast of Rye, New Hampshire, United States.

Trees of these forests sank below sea level after the ending of the Wisconsin glaciation (approximately 11,000 years ago) and subsequent rise in temperature; isostatic rebound has not kept pace with the rise in sea level, and former coastal forests were overtaken by the Atlantic Ocean. The trees could not thrive, even when they were in the early stages of being submerged, as they cannot live in salt water for very long. All that is left of the forests are stumps.

== Forests ==
The seafloor on which these sunken forests sit was probably submerged after the Wisconsin glaciation. The position of the New England coastline at that time is a matter of speculation, with some estimates suggesting the coastline was once 75 miles (121 km) east of its current position. Fishermen have hauled up mastodon and mammoth teeth dozens of miles offshore, suggesting the forest extended quite far.

=== Odiorne Point ===
Near Odiorne Point State Park in Rye, this sunken forest is referred to as the "Drowned Forest". The roots of different coniferous trees (including white pine and hemlock) are visible at most low tides. Core samples taken from the roots indicate that the trees are about 3,500 to 4,000 years old. Scuba divers commonly explore the Drowned Forest to learn about these ancient remains.

=== Jenness Beach ===
The sunken forest near Jenness Beach (and Jenness State Beach) in Rye is rarely sighted above sea level—recorded sightings have occurred in 1940, 1958, 1962, 1978, and 2010. Newspaper reports of other sightings include a 1931 investigation by a professor from Dartmouth College who identified the stumps as "swamp cedar". The trees, 8 to 10 feet (2.4 to 3.0 m) in circumference, have been carbon dated from 3,400 to 3,800 years old, and growth rings indicate they lived for more than 100 years. While the forest may have been vast, as of the 1978 sighting only 56 stumps remained.

The transatlantic telegraph cable laid in 1874—which ran from Rye to Tor Bay, Nova Scotia, and then to Ireland—went through this sunken forest. A newspaper report in August 1933 noted that stumps of the forest and "a section of the old Atlantic cable" could be seen during an extremely low tide. Photographs of the cable running through the sunken forest were published in a newspaper article in April 1958.

== See also ==
- Ghost forest
- New Hampshire Historical Marker No. 63: Atlantic Cable Station and Sunken Forest

== Sources ==
- Pielou, E. C. (1992). After the Ice Age: The Return of Life to Glaciated North America. University of Chicago Press. ISBN 978-0226668123.
