= Bradlee, Winslow & Wetherell =

Defunct American architectural firm

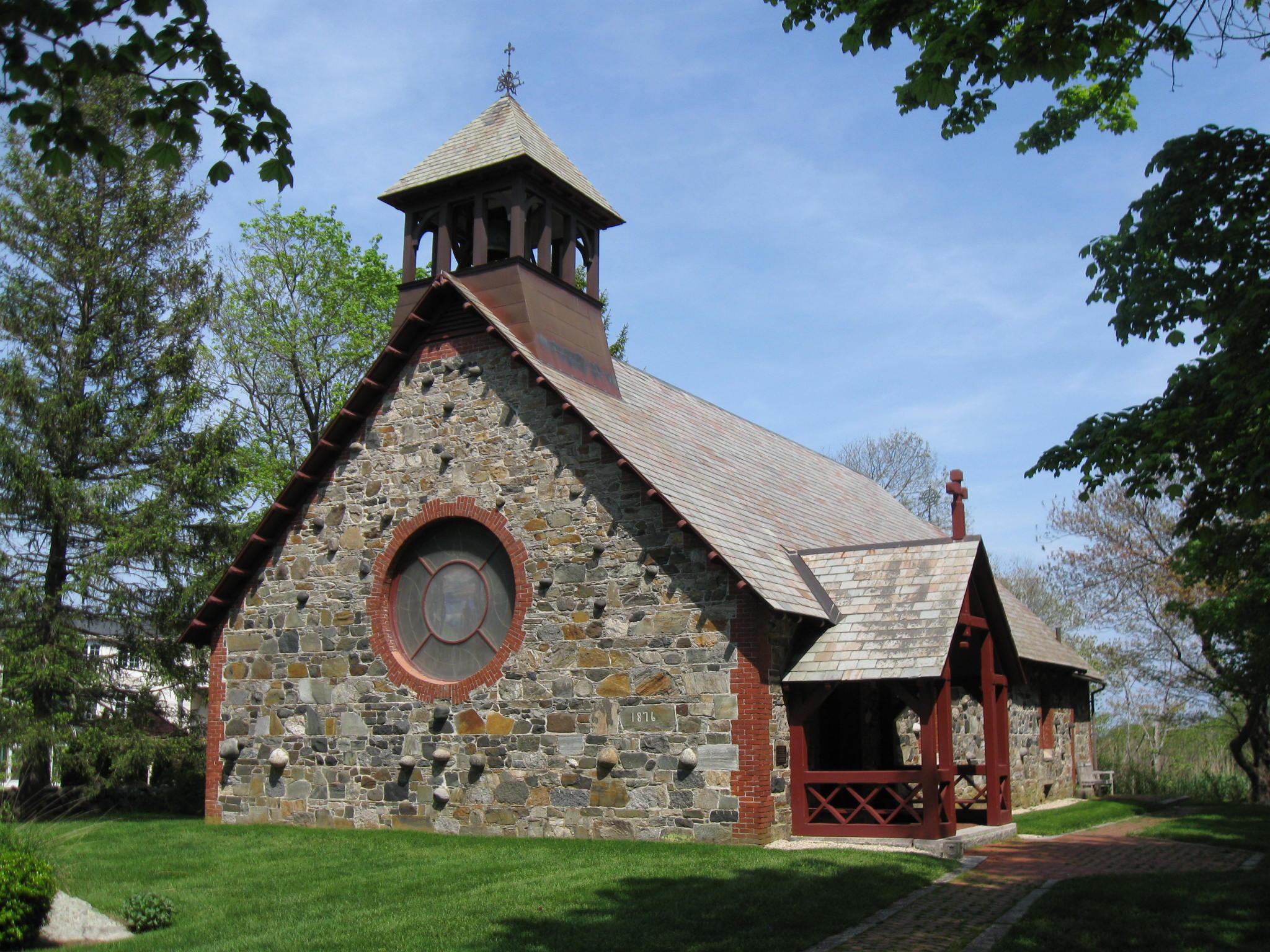
St. Andrew's By-The-Sea, credited to Winslow & Wetherell

Bradlee, Winslow & Wetherell (1872–1888) was an architecture firm in Boston, Massachusetts. Its principals were Nathaniel Jeremiah Bradlee (1829–1888), Walter Thacher Winslow (1843–1909) and George Homans Wetherell (1854–1930). Most of the firm's work was local to Boston and New England, with a few commissions as far afield as Seattle and Kansas City.

The firm is variously credited. Nathaniel Bradlee had run a thriving solo practice in Boston since 1854. In 1872 Bradlee promoted Winslow to partner, creating Bradlee & Winslow for 12 years. (Bradlee appears to retain solo credit for some projects afterward, for example Danvers State Hospital.) In 1884 Wetherell was also promoted, creating Bradlee, Winslow & Wetherell.

Bradlee died in 1888. Winslow & Wetherell then formed their partnership as Bradlee's successor firm. Architect Henry Forbes Bigelow (1867-1929) joined the organization around 1898, after which the partnership was credited as Winslow, Wetherell & Bigelow, then Winslow & Bigelow, and in its last incarnation Winslow, Bigelow & Wadsworth. Winslow died in 1909 and control of the partnership went to Bigelow.

A number of works by the firm are listed on the National Register of Historic Places.

== Work ==
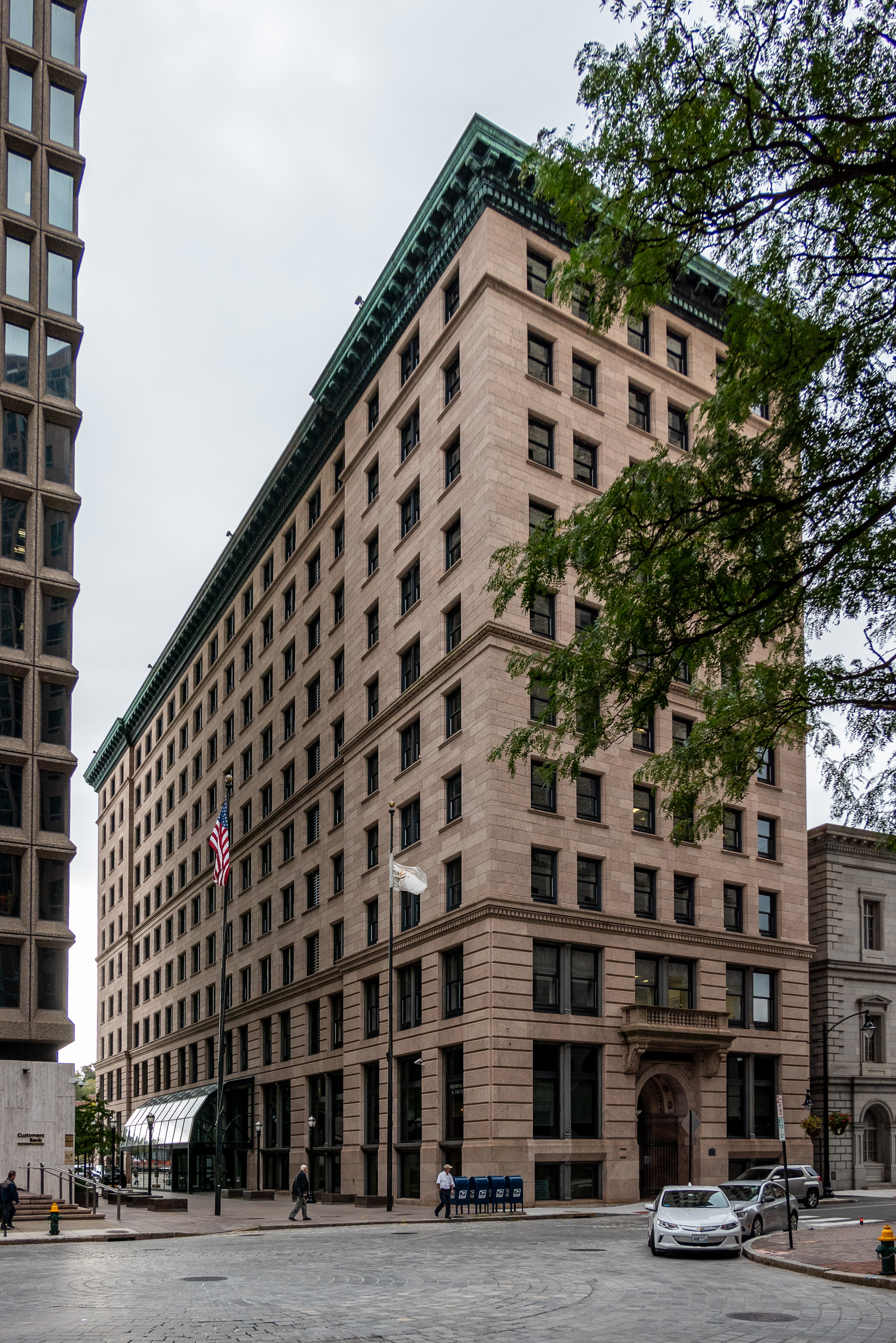
Providence's Banigan Building (1896)

Works include (with attribution):

- Wigglesworth Building, 89-83 Franklin St., Boston, 1873 (Bradlee & Winslow)
- St. Andrew's By-The-Sea, Church Rd., 0.2 mi. SE of jct. with South Rd. and Rte. 1A Rye, NH, 1876 (credited to Winslow and Wetherell), NRHP-listed
- Bijou Theatre, Boston, 1882 (Bradlee & Winslow)
- Chickering Hall, Tremont St., Boston, 1883 (Bradlee & Winslow)
- Old New England Building, Kansas City, Missouri, 1886 (Bradlee, Winslow & Wetherell), NRHP-listed
- Union Station, Portland, Maine, 1888 (Bradlee, Winslow & Wetherell)
- Maine Central Railroad General Office Building, 222-224 Saint John Street, Portland, Maine, 1889 (Bradlee, Winslow & Wetherell), NRHP-listed, built out in stages through 1916
- The Oaks, 437 E. Beverly St. Staunton, Virginia, 1890 (Winslow & Wetherell), NRHP-listed
- Building at 30–34 Station Street, Brookline, Massachusetts, 1892 (Winslow & Wetherell), NRHP-listed
- Boston Block, Pioneer Square, Seattle, Washington, 1896 (razed 1921)
- Banigan Building, Providence, Rhode Island, Providence's first skyscraper, 1896 (Winslow & Wetherell)
- Steinert Hall, Boston, 1896 (Winslow & Bigelow)
- Boston Hotel Buckminster, Boston, 1897 (Winslow & Bigelow)
- Hotel Touraine, Boston, 1897 (Winslow & Bigelow)
- St. Mark's School, Southborough, Massachusetts, 1902 (Winslow & Bigelow)
- Needham Town Hall Historic District, Needham, Massachusetts, 1902 (Winslow & Bigelow)
- Compton Building, Boston, 1903 (Winslow & Bigelow)
- Boston Edison Electric Illuminating Company building, Boston, 1906 (Winslow & Bigelow)
- Antiquitarian Hall, for the American Antiquarian Society, Worcester, Massachusetts, 1910 (Winslow, Bigelow & Wadsworth)
- Children's Hospital Boston, Huntington Ave. (Bradlee, Winslow & Wetherell)
- Buildings in the Baker Chocolate mill complex in the Dorchester-Milton Lower Mills Industrial District, Massachusetts (Bradlee, Winslow, & Wetherell; Winslow & Wetherell; Winslow & Bigelow)

== Gallery ==
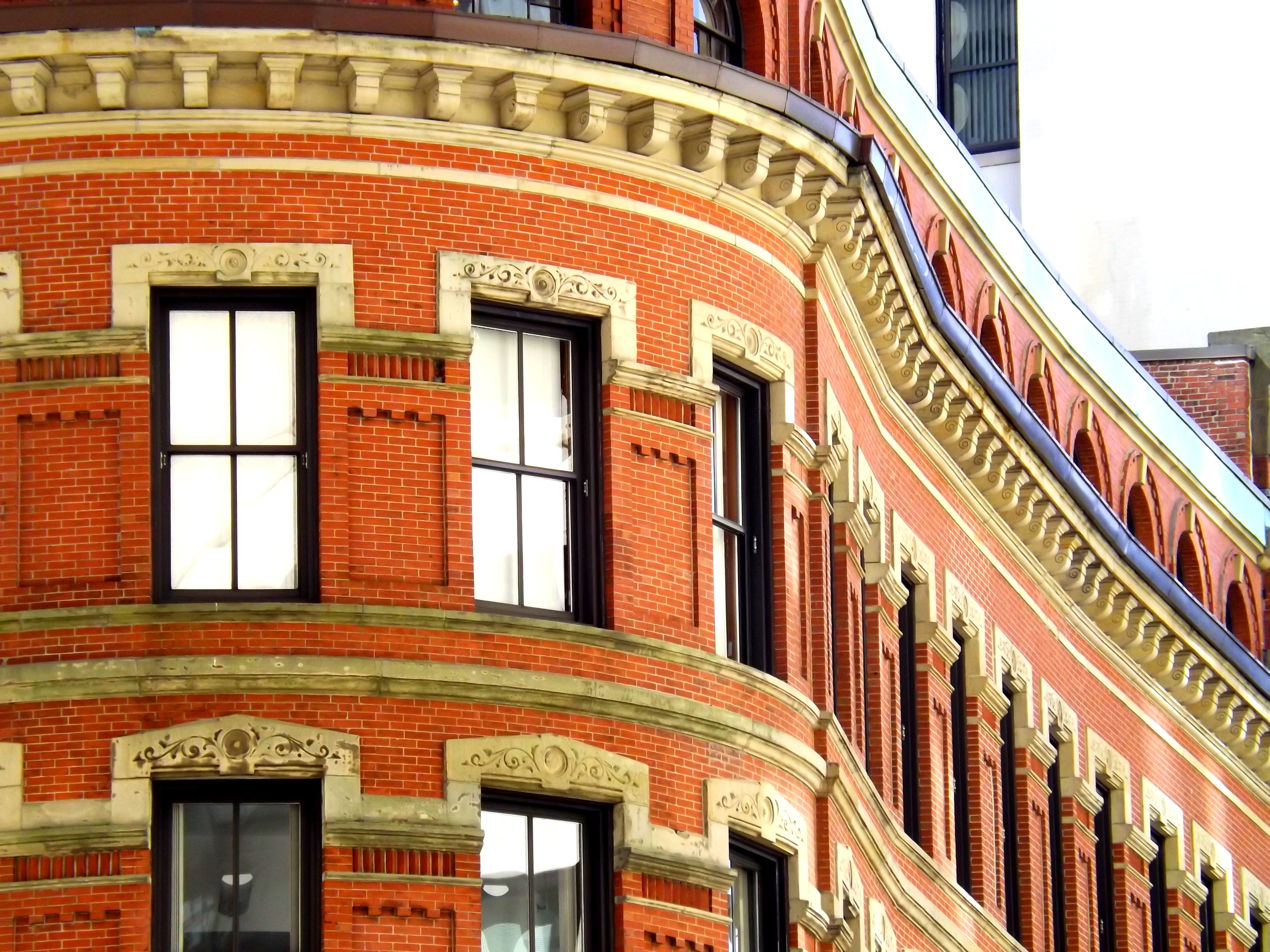
Wigglesworth Building (1873), Boston

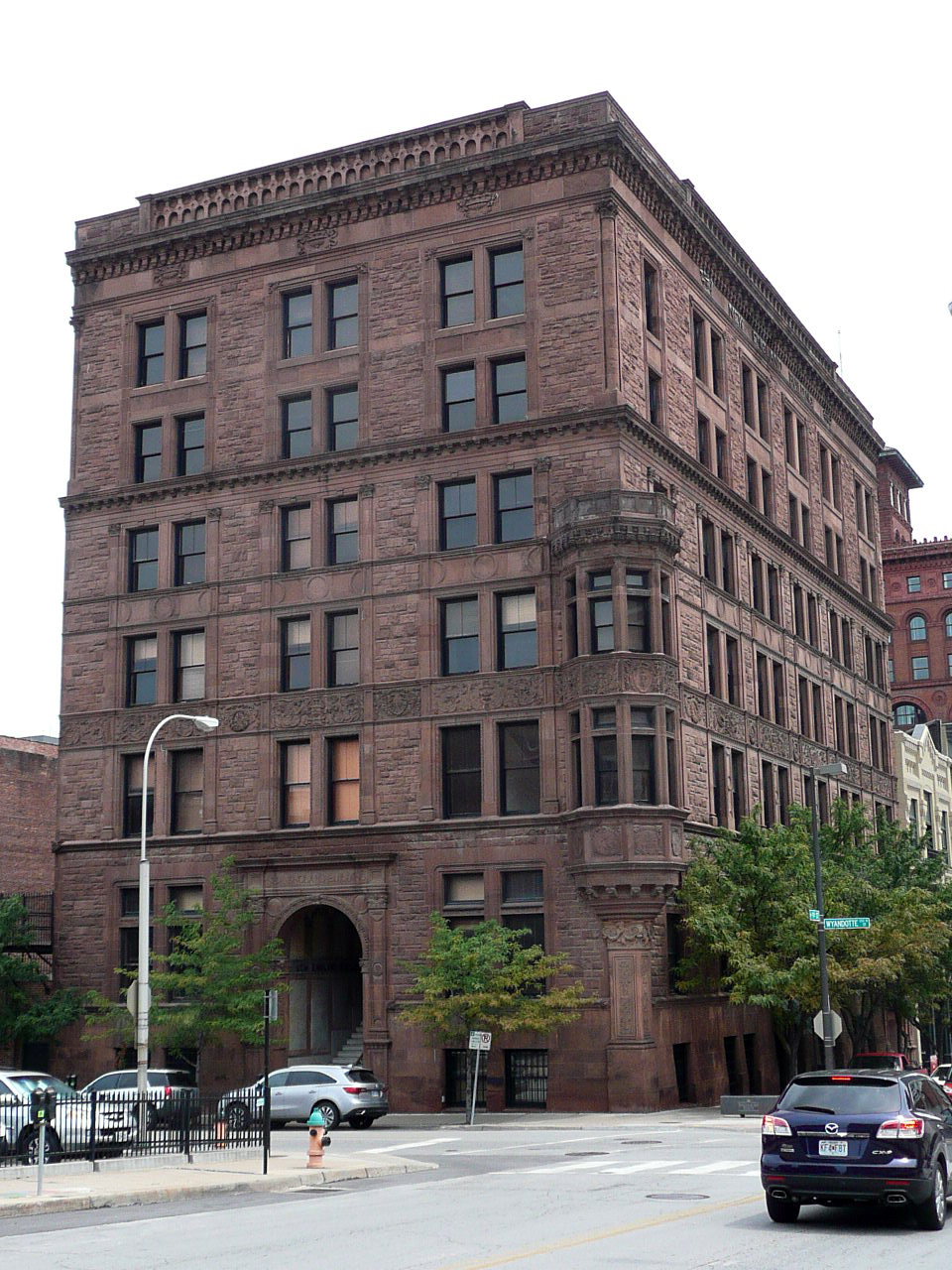
Old New England Building (1886), Kansas City, Missouri

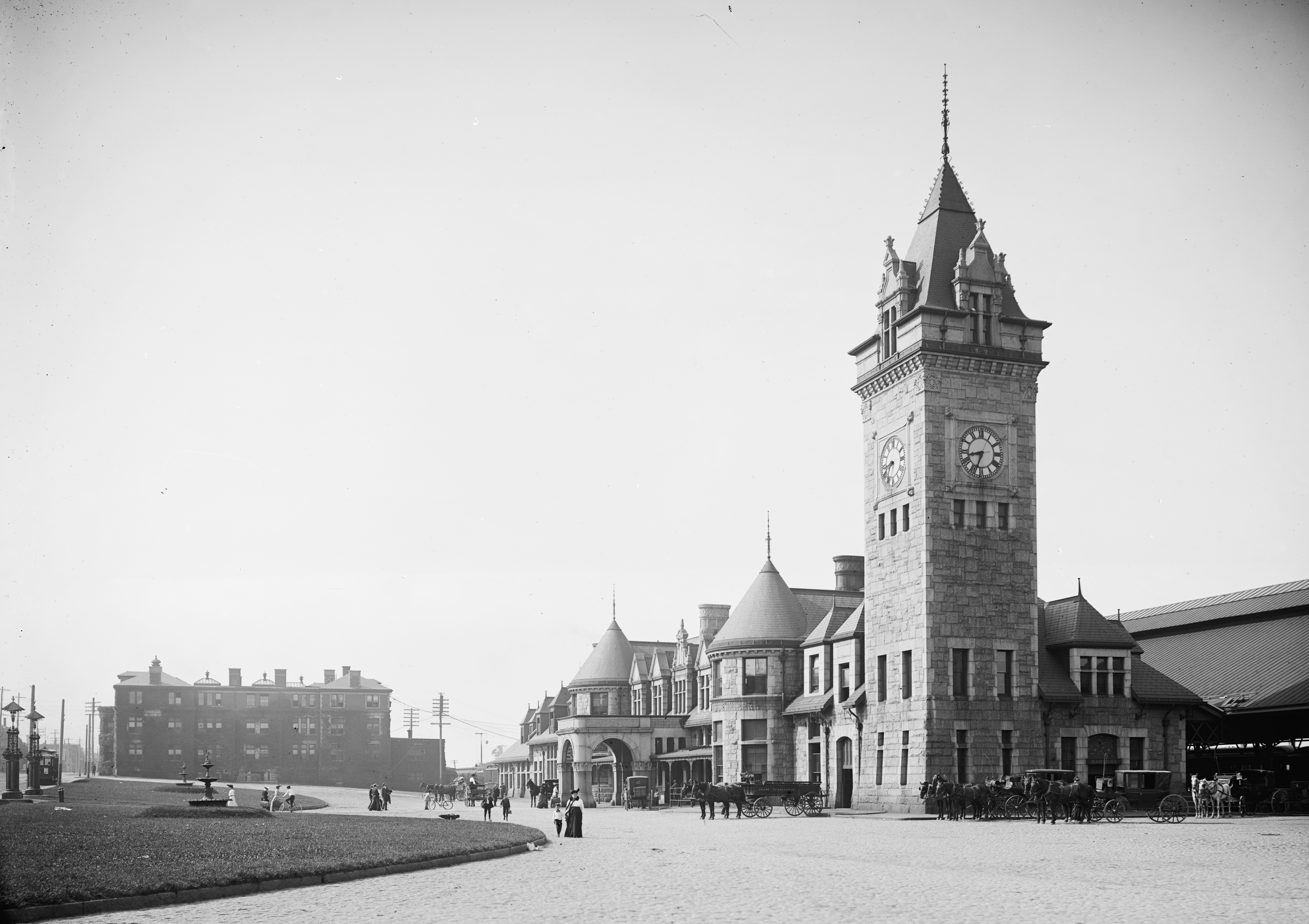
Union Station (1888), Portland, Maine

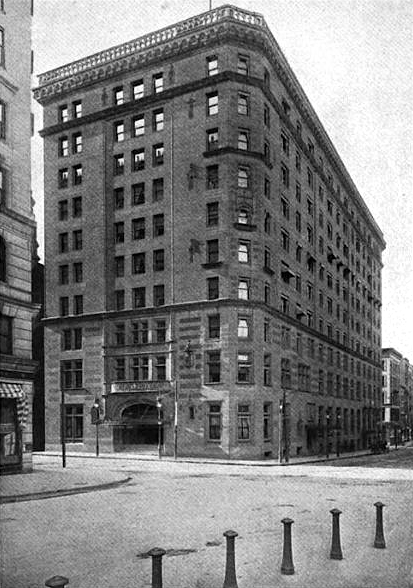
Hotel Touraine (1897), Boston

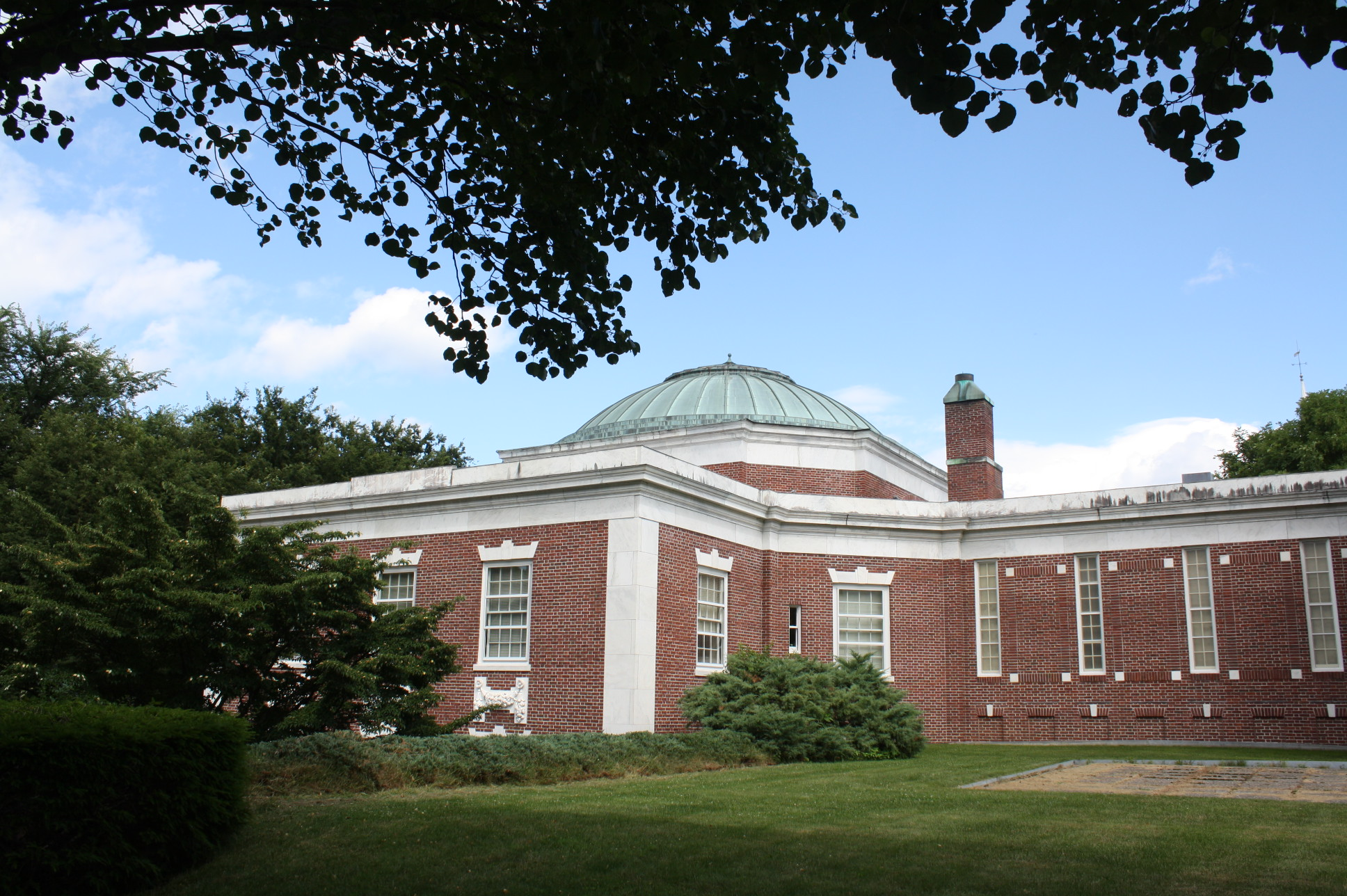
Antiquitarian Hall (1910), Worcester, Massachusetts
