= St. Andrew's-by-the-Sea =

Historic church in New Hampshire, United States

- U.S. National Register of Historic Places
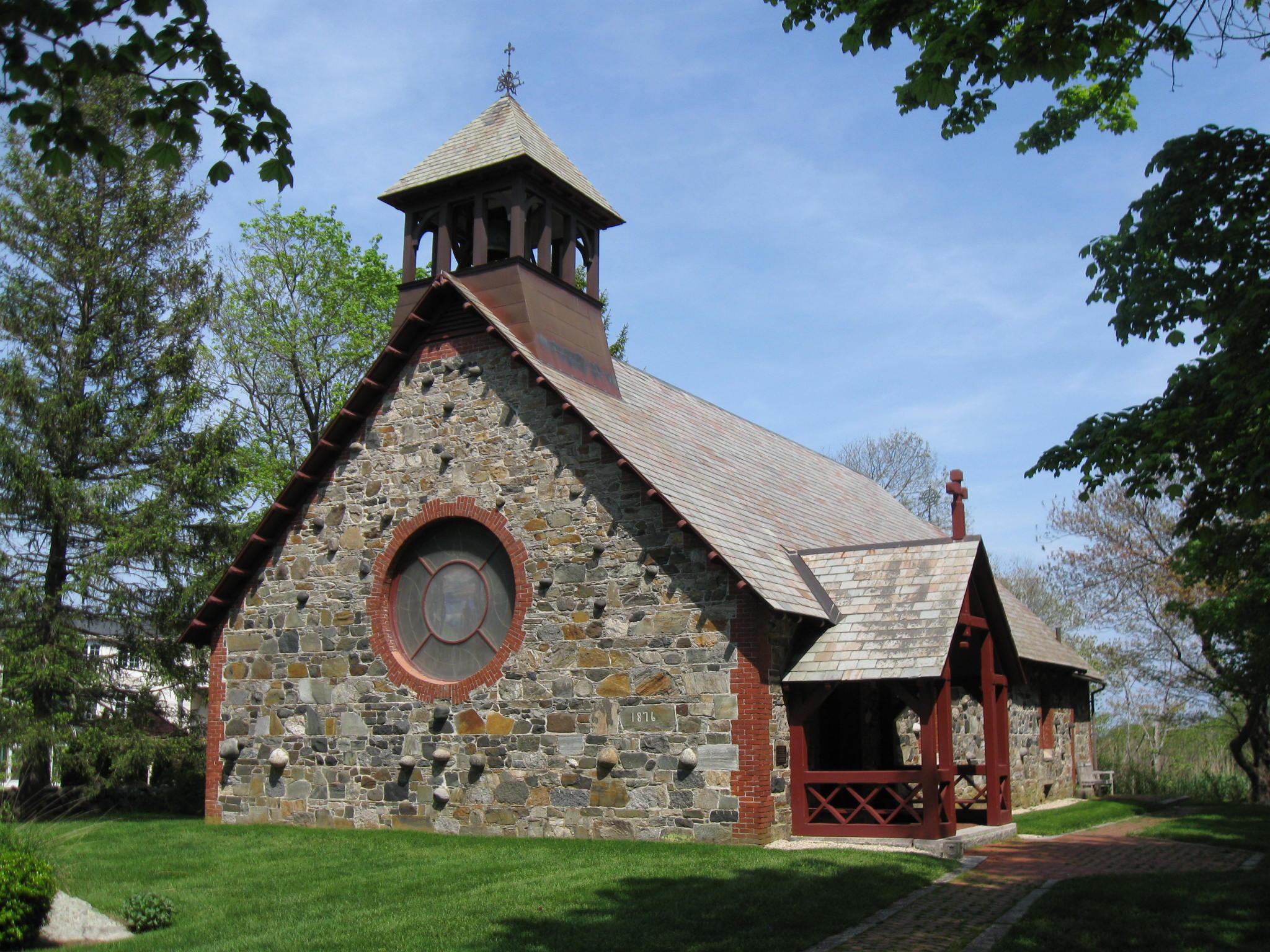

- Location within New Hampshire Location within the United States
- Location: Church Rd., 0.2 mi. SE of jct. with South Rd. and Rte. 1A, Rye, New Hampshire
- Coordinates: 42°58′27″N 70°46′2″W
- Area: 0.1 acres (0.040 ha)
- Built: 1876
- Architect: Winslow and Wetherell
- Architectural style: Stick/Eastlake
- NRHP reference No.: 01001352
- Added to NRHP: December 13, 2001

St. Andrew's-by-the-Sea is a historic summer Episcopal chapel on Church Road, southeast of the junction with South Road and Route 1A in Rye, New Hampshire. Built in 1876, it is the only known religious work of Boston architects Winslow & Wetherell, and one of a modest number of churches built for summer vacationers in the state. It is an eclectic mix of Gothic Revival and Stick Style, and was listed on the National Register of Historic Places in 2001.

== Description and history ==
St. Andrew's-by-the-Sea stands near New Hampshire's seacoast in southern Rye, on the east side of Church Road south of Jenness State Beach. It is a single-story structure built of stone and timber, with brick quoining at the corners. It has a slate roof and a small belfry topped by a pyramidal roof. The chapel's stained glass windows were designed by John La Farge, the Connick Studios, and Tiffany & Co. Other major features of the interior include massive timber trusses supporting the roof, and an elaborately carved oak pulpit. The church property includes a small graveyard and is surrounded by a low stone wall, with a lich gate built in 1977 as a reconstruction of an original.

In 1864 Rye's first Episcopal services were held at the nearby Farragut Hotel. This chapel was built in 1876 to serve Rye's large summer resort community. It was designed by the Boston architects Winslow & Wetherell, and is their only known work in New Hampshire. It is also their only known religious work; the partners worked primarily on commercial projects, particularly after the Great Boston Fire of 1872.

The chapel is used for Episcopal services in the summer.

== See also ==
- National Register of Historic Places listings in Rockingham County, New Hampshire
