= Elijah Locke House =

Historic house in New Hampshire, United States

- U.S. National Register of Historic Places
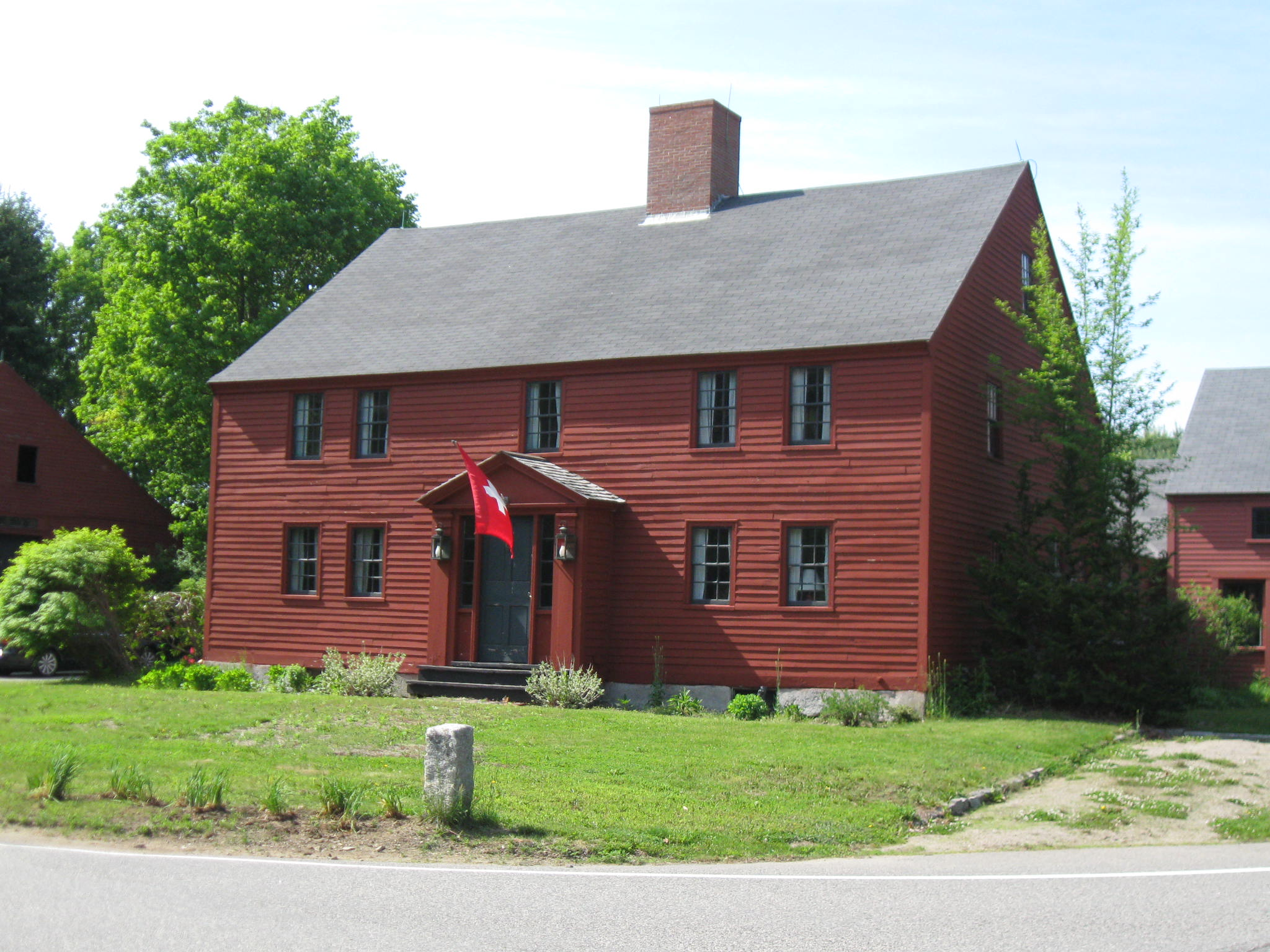

- Location within New Hampshire Location within the United States
- Location: 5 Grove Rd., Rye, New Hampshire
- Coordinates: 42°59′45″N 70°46′29″W
- Area: 0.6 acres (0.24 ha)
- Built: 1739
- Built by: Locke, William; Locke, Elijah
- NRHP reference No.: 79000206
- Added to NRHP: December 19, 1979

The Elijah Locke House is a historic house at 5 Grove Road in Rye, New Hampshire. Traditionally ascribed a construction date of 1739, it is one of the oldest surviving buildings in New Hampshire's Seacoast region. It was listed on the National Register of Historic Places in 1979.

== Description and history ==
The Elijah Locke House stands in a rural residential setting in central southern Rye, at the junction of Grove and Central Roads. It is a 2 1/2-story wood-frame structure, with a side-gable roof, central chimney, and clapboarded exterior. It has a typical Georgian facade, five bays wide with a central entrance, and a rear single-story addition (also an 18th-century structure). The entrance is a projecting gabled section, with the door framed by pilasters and a gabled pediment. The interior has been sensitively modernized, retaining some original features. Outbuildings on the property include a barn and carriage house, both of which appear to date to the second quarter of the 19th century. Two other outbuildings of 19th century origin have been demolished.

Captain John Locke was one of the earliest settlers of New Hampshire, arriving in 1644. This house was built either by his son William in 1729, or his grandson Elijah in 1739; the latter date is found incised on one of the original roof beams. John Locke was killed by Native Americans in 1696; William was a shopkeeper in Portsmouth. The house has spent many years in (and out of) ownership by Locke's descendants.

== See also ==
- National Register of Historic Places listings in Rockingham County, New Hampshire
