= Wigglesworth Building =

- U.S. National Register of Historic Places
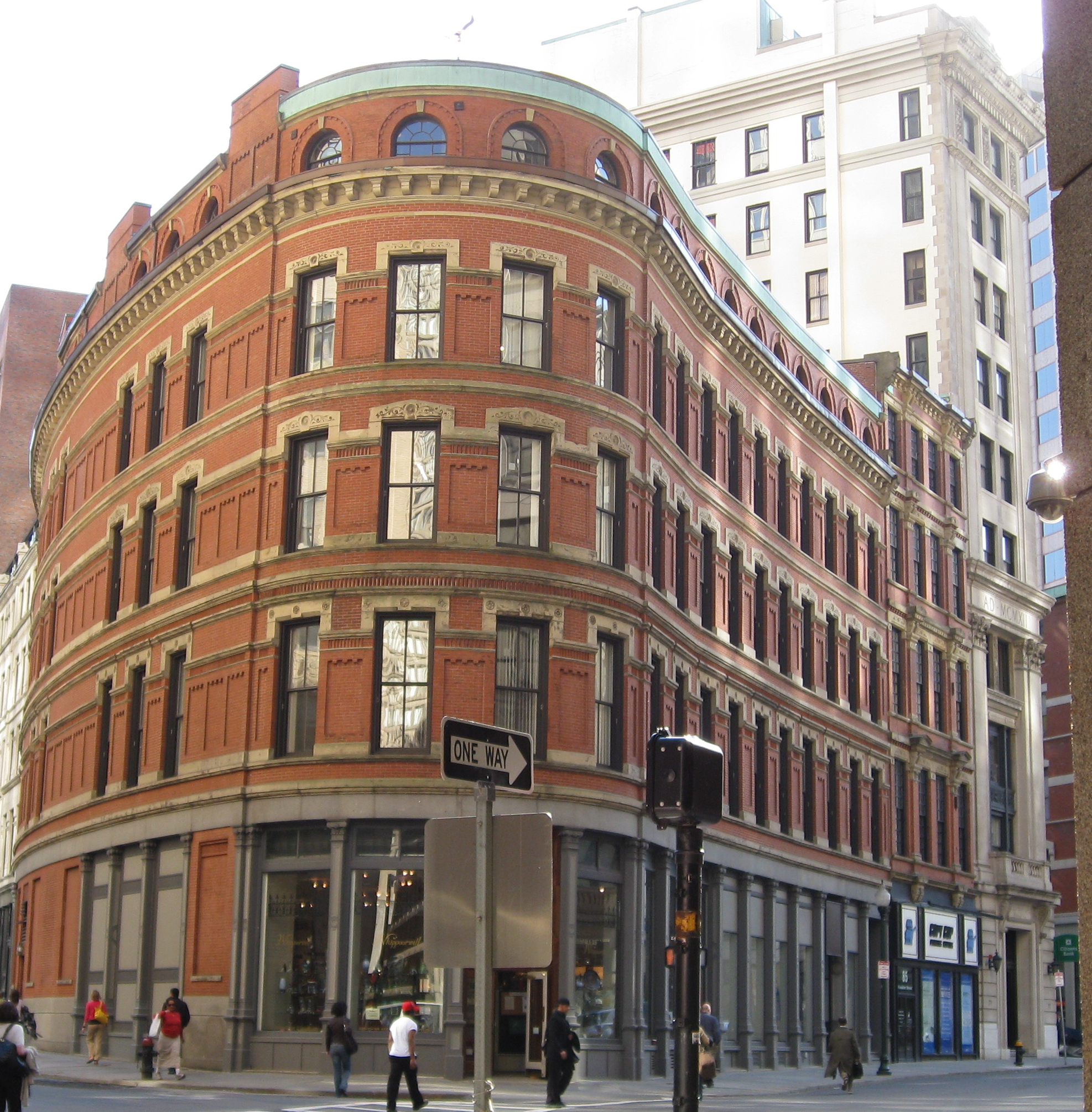

- Location within Boston Location within Massachusetts Location within the United States
- Location: Boston, Massachusetts
- Coordinates: 42°21′18″N 71°3′29″W
- Built: 1873
- Architect: Nathaniel J. Bradlee; Winslow & Wetherell
- Architectural style: Gothic Revival
- NRHP reference No.: 82000486
- Added to NRHP: October 21, 1982

The Wigglesworth Building is a historic building at 89-83 Franklin Street in the Financial District of Boston, Massachusetts. The five-story Neo-Gothic Panel Brick building was constructed in 1873, and was one of the first buildings rebuilt after the Great Boston Fire of 1872. Designed by Nathaniel Bradlee of Bradlee, Winslow & Wetherell, it features a curving red panel brick front with detailed sandstone panels. The top floor, added in 1885, is set back from the main facade and features arched windows. It was apparently designed by Peabody & Stearns, who did design work for the building after an 1884 fire.

The building was listed on the National Register of Historic Places in 1982.

== See also ==
- National Register of Historic Places listings in northern Boston, Massachusetts
