= Needham Town Hall Historic District =

Historic district in Massachusetts, United States

- U.S. National Register of Historic Places
- U.S. Historic district
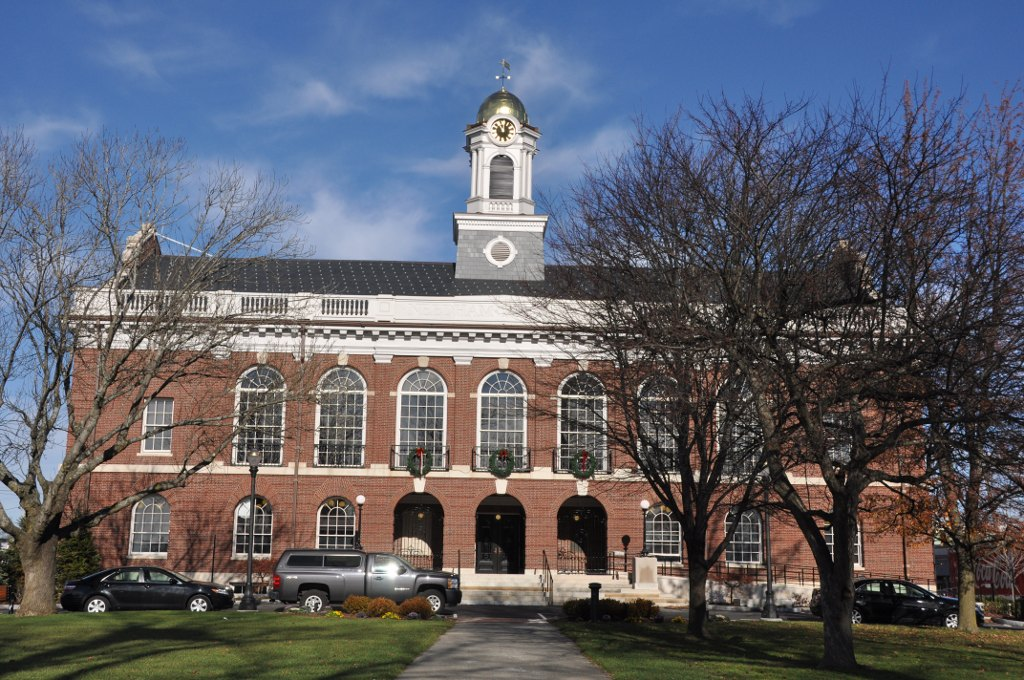

- Location within Massachusetts Location within the United States
- Location: Needham, Massachusetts
- Coordinates: 42°17′20″N 71°14′26″W
- Area: 1.25 acres (0.51 ha)
- Built: 1902
- Architect: Winslow & Bigelow; Bigelow, Henry F.
- Architectural style: Colonial Revival, Other
- NRHP reference No.: 90001756
- Added to NRHP: November 15, 1990

The Needham Town Hall Historic District is a historic district on Great Plain Avenue between Highland Avenue and Chapel Street in Needham, Massachusetts. It encompasses Needham Town Hall, a Georgian Revival structure built in 1902 to a design by Winslow & Bigelow, and the grassy public park in front of it, which was established in 1884. The district was listed on the National Register of Historic Places in 1990.

== Description and history ==
Needham Town Hall is located in the village center of the town, which is roughly near its geographic center. It is set between Chapel Street (west) and Highland Avenue (east), and faces south, across the town common to Great Plain Avenue (Massachusetts Route 135). It is a 2 1/2-story brick structure, with a gabled slate roof and granite foundation. A tower, housing a bell and clock, rises to a golden dome atop the building. The building's first floor is finished in a rusticated manner, and is separated from the finer second floor by a granite stringcourse. At the center of the main façade are three round-arch openings, sheltering the recessed building entrance. Most of the windows are sashes topped by round arch sections. Pilasters separate the bays on the second floor, and support a frieze and modillioned cornice below the roof. The roof is encircled by a low balustrade.

The town common is separated from town hall by a curving drive. It is a grassy rectangular area, with walkways crossing it and occasional plantings of trees and shrubs. Fronting Great Plain Avenue is an area with a flagpole and a brick memorial wall.

Needham was settled in 1680 and incorporated (out of Dedham) in 1711. It was a mainly agricultural area, with industry center on the Charles River in its northernmost areas. Its town center was at the junction of Central Avenue and Nehoiden Street, about 1 mile (1.6 km) to the west of the present center. When the railroad was routed around that center in 1853, the area then known as Great Plain Village became the dominant commercial and civic area. In 1884 the town purchased the land for the common and town hall, to create a new central civic point in the growing village. The town hall, designed by Winslow and Bigelow of Boston, was completed in 1903. Its upper level, originally an open hall, was used for town meetings and all manner of social gatherings until 1952, when it was subdivided into offices.

== See also ==
- National Register of Historic Places listings in Norfolk County, Massachusetts
