= Maynard L. Young Jr. =

American politician

Member of the New Hampshire House of Representatives
- In office 1963–1964

Personal details
- Born: Maynard Lindsey Young Jr. September 24, 1924 Rye, New Hampshire, U.S.
- Died: June 28, 2009 (aged 84) Portsmouth, New Hampshire, U.S.
- Party: Republican
- Education: Northeastern University

Maynard Lindsey Young Jr. (September 24, 1924 – June 28, 2009) was an American politician. A member of the Republican Party, he served in the New Hampshire House of Representatives from 1963 to 1964.

== Life and career ==
Young was born in Rye, New Hampshire, the son of Maynard Linsay Young Sr., an advance planner, and Henrietta Blow. He served in the United States Army during the Korean War, which after his discharge, he attended Northeastern University, earning his BS degree in 1950.

Young served in the New Hampshire House of Representatives from 1963 to 1964.

== Death ==
Young died on June 28, 2009, at the Portsmouth Regional Hospital in Portsmouth, New Hampshire, at the age of 84.
