= Parsons Homestead =

Historic house in New Hampshire, United States

- U.S. National Register of Historic Places
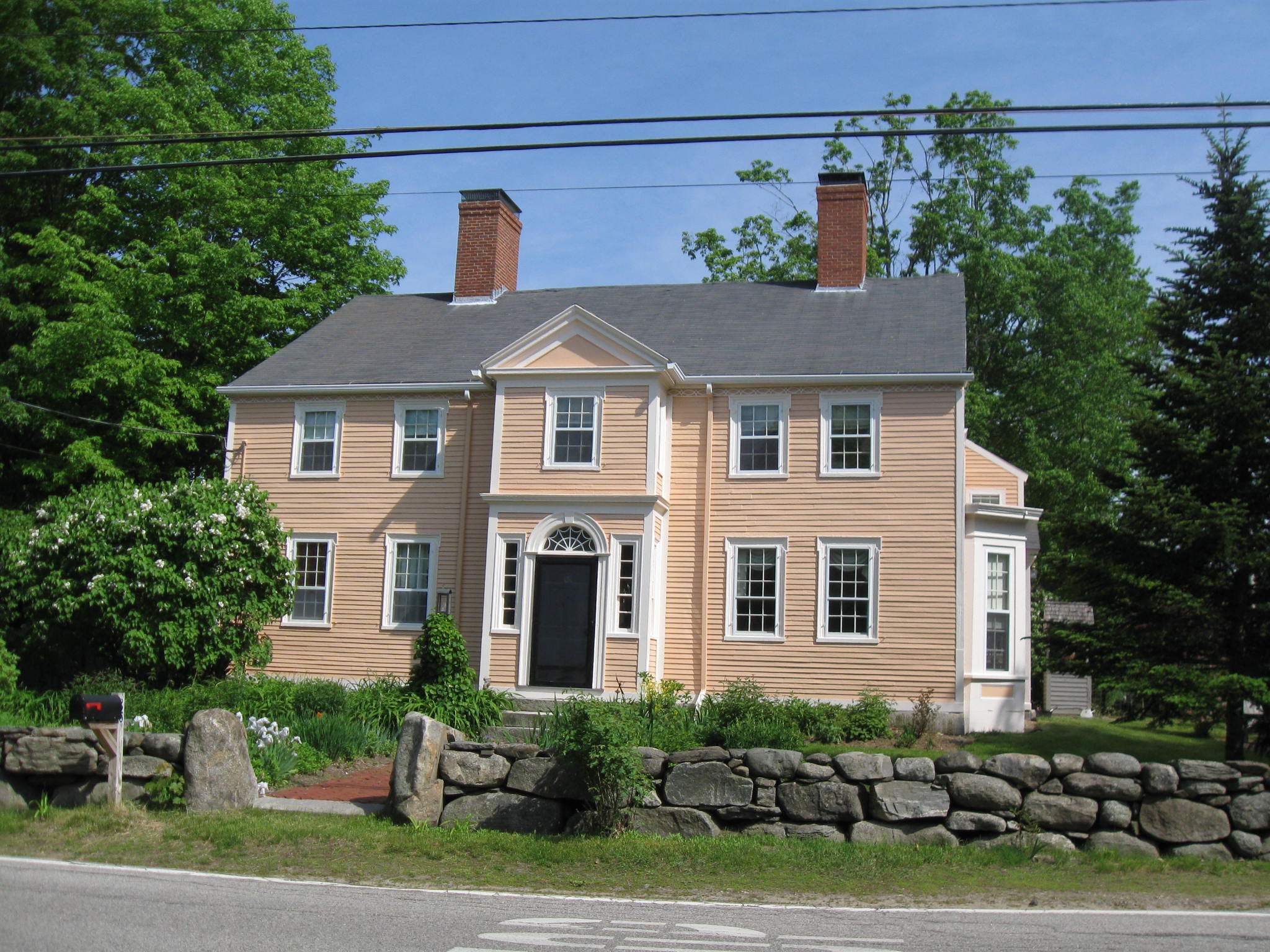

- Location within New Hampshire Location within the United States
- Location: 520 Washington Rd., Rye, New Hampshire
- Coordinates: 43°0′49″N 70°46′14″W
- Area: 52 acres (21 ha)
- Built: 1757
- Architectural style: Georgian
- NRHP reference No.: 80000420
- Added to NRHP: December 5, 1980

The Parsons Homestead is a historic house at 520 Washington Road in Rye, New Hampshire. Probably built at around 1800 but including portions of older buildings, it is a well-preserved example of a distinctive local variant of the Federal style of architecture. It was listed on the National Register of Historic Places in 1980.

== Description and history ==
The Parsons Homestead stands in the village center of Rye, on the southeast side of Washington Road, nearly opposite its junction with Lang Road. It is a 2 1/2-story wood-frame structure, with a side-gable roof and clapboarded exterior. It has two interior brick chimneys, and a five-bay front facade. The central bay is a two-story gabled projection, a distinctive local variant of the Federal style that is now seen in only a few surviving examples. The main entrance is at the base of the projection, flanked by sidelight windows and topped by a half-round transom. Sash windows are placed in the other bays, framed by molded surrounds.

The construction date of this house is traditionally given as 1757, but there is no significant architectural evidence supporting a construction date before about 1800. Portions of the house (a stairway and some posts) appear to have been recycled from an older house. The interior woodwork is among the finest of the period in Rye. The builder of the house is not known.

== See also ==
- National Register of Historic Places listings in Rockingham County, New Hampshire
