= Steinert Hall =

Music venue in Boston, Massachusetts, U.S.

Coordinates: 42°21′8.69″N 71°4′0.55″W

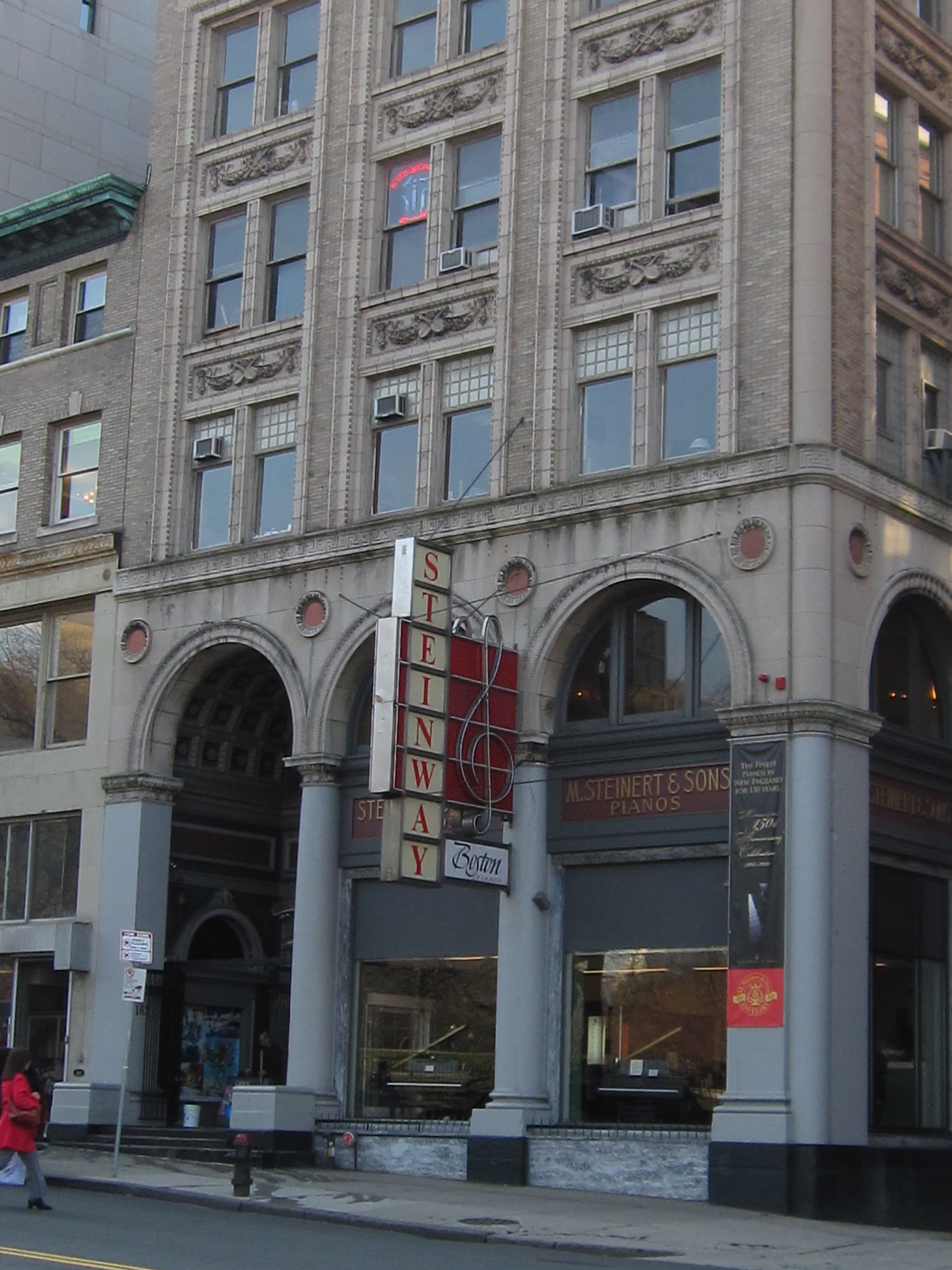
Steinert Hall, Boylston St., Boston (2012)

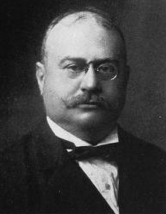
Alexander Steinert (1861–1933)

Steinert Hall was a subterranean recital hall at 162 Boylston Street in Boston that held concerts four stories beneath the Piano Row District in Boston beginning in February 1897. Steinert Hall held 300 to 650 people, and audiences entered it from a staircase at 162 Boylston Street. Following the Cocoanut Grove nightclub fire in 1942, heightened fire codes caused the concert hall to close indefinitely. Largely abandoned, Steinert Hall remains in a state of disrepair beneath Boston's Piano Row, highly busy blocks facing Boston Common and the Theater District.

== Underground performance auditorium ==
=== Steinert family piano business ===
In 1860, Bavarian immigrant Morris Steinert founded the sole Steinway piano dealer in New England, M. Steinert & Sons. Morris was a close associate of William Steinway and eventually founded the New Haven Symphony, which was originally "Steinert's Family Orchestra. His son Alexander Steinert (1861–1933), took over M. Steinert & Sons and drove expansion across the Northeast. Recognizing the commercial potential of piano sales, M. Steinert & Sons acquired the Aeolian, Hume, and Jewett piano companies. In 1883, the company opened its first flagship showroom in Boston's Piano Row District, which was soon expanded into a bigger building.

=== Steinert Hall construction ===
The next M. Steinert & Sons showroom was built on property left for the company by the political titan Charles Frances Adams Sr., a well-known figure whose father and grandfather served as presidents of the United States. Alexander Steinert erected a six-story building on the site complete with an underground performance space called Steinert Hall. (Note: In 1883 company founder Morris Steinert relocated the firm's headquarters to Boston (by way of Georgia, Connecticut, and Rhode Island). Around 1889 "Steinert Hall" opened in Boston's Hotel Boylston, located at the corner of Tremont Street and Boylston Street; the building existed until 1894.) He commissioned architects Winslow and Wetherell, who designed the limestone and brick Beaux Arts facade with copper cornice and terra-cotta. In 1896, the finished building had 37,000 sq ft in all. In a basement 35 feet below ground, on February 23, 1897, Steinert Hall opened to the public with a performance by Carl Baermann.

Steinert Hall was "headquarters for the musical and artistic world of cultured Boston," wrote Alfred Dolge in 1911. Steinert's distinguished, high-class audiences were "interested in new music" such as compositions by Richard Strauss. Steinert hosted Rachmaninoff on several United States tours and featured several concerts per week by performers like Fritz Kreisler, Ignacy Jan Paderewski (pianist and eventual prime minister of Poland), Josef Lhévinne, Josef Hofmann, and Mary Garden. Lecturers at Steinert included Mary Baker Eddy, Gertrude Barrows Bennett, and Jacob Riis. Prominent members of culture attended Steinert shows, such as Julia Ward Howe, and audiences were characterized by sophistication.

=== Architecture ===
Steinert Hall was built four stories below the ground, where it was virtually silent despite being along a busy Boston thoroughfare. Designed by architects Winslow and Wetherell and accessible by stairs, the hall boasted electric light fixtures, ventilation, and upholstered chairs to seat 300 guests. The recital hall is characterized by Adam-style design, fluted Corinthian pilasters, round arches, and a wall mural signed "C.A. Aiken" (possibly Charles Avery Aiken). Wall panels on each side of the stage display the names of prominent composers: Schumann, Beethoven, Haydn, Bach, Mozart, and Schubert.

=== Close ===
Steinert Hall was closed in 1942, following heightened fire regulations that were enacted after the Cocoanut Grove nightclub fire killed 492 people. Steinert Hall only had one means of egress and required extensive alterations to comply with code. Though some safety features were added, like sprinkler pipes installed across the vaulted ceiling, the prohibitive cost caused M. Steinert & Sons to abandon the project indefinitely. Steinert Hall closed its doors to the public. For several decades, it was used for music lessons and as a practice space, but by 2000, use of Steinert Hall had long dwindled.

=== Deserted and disrepair ===
More than eight decades have passed since Steinert Hall shuttered, and the deserted recital hall has fallen into disrepair. M. Steinert & Sons, a piano dealer and owner of the largely-abandoned Steinert Hall, have used the main floor and balcony as a cluttered storage space for piano components. "It’s where old pianos come to die", said building manager Colman McDonagh in a 2013 tour given to The Boston Globe. In rare visits, M. Steinert & Sons has permitted select musicians inside the deserted space, such as pianist Janice Weber who recorded two albums there in the 1980s and Elton John who stopped by in the 1990s and was into the "apocalyptic" atmosphere.

Steinert Hall was built below the water table and has repeatedly suffered from flooding. Leaks regularly trickle down from the streets above, and particularly intense water damage came from a 1960s pipe break, which was caused by construction on a nearby parking garage. Peeling paint, hole-covered wales, and rusted ironwork demonstrate decades of damage.

Steinert Hall was once a designated bomb shelter, and was outfitted with Geiger counters to measure radiation.

=== Proposed renovation ===
In 2013, the Steinert & Sons president Paul Murphy estimated restoration would exceed $6 million, and that "it would have to be a labor of love". In May 2015, developers from B Minor LLC purchased the building and planned to renovate it, with a goal of reopening Steinert Hall for performances following a 15 to 18 month renovation project. Following the sale, M. Steinert & Sons moved a portion of its inventory to a new storage building in 2016, though it continues to use the building's showroom. In January 2018, company president Paul Murphy said architect plans were ready to go, suggesting the new owner and other tenants of the building might affect when the potential renovation would occur. As of 2025, Steinert Hall has not reopened.

The Steinway store continues to operate above Steinert Hall. "The ghosts come around every once and awhile," jokes Paul Murphy.

== Vintage advertising ==
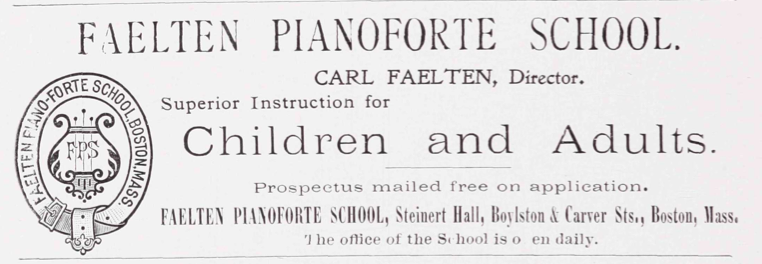
1898

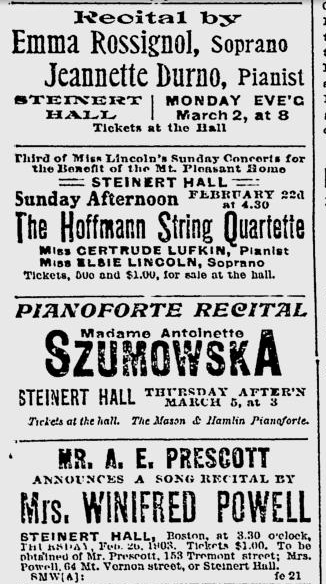
1903

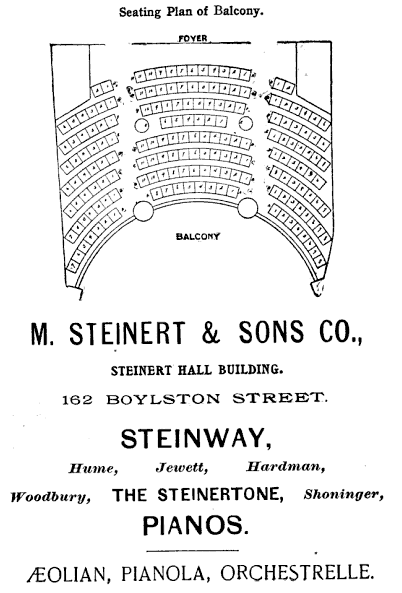
1904

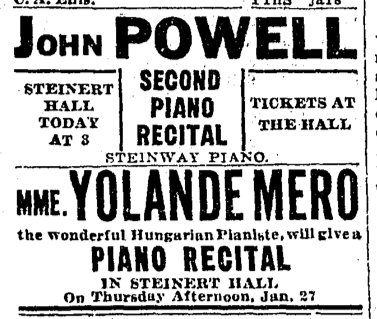
1916
