= Piano Row District =

- U.S. National Register of Historic Places
- U.S. Historic district
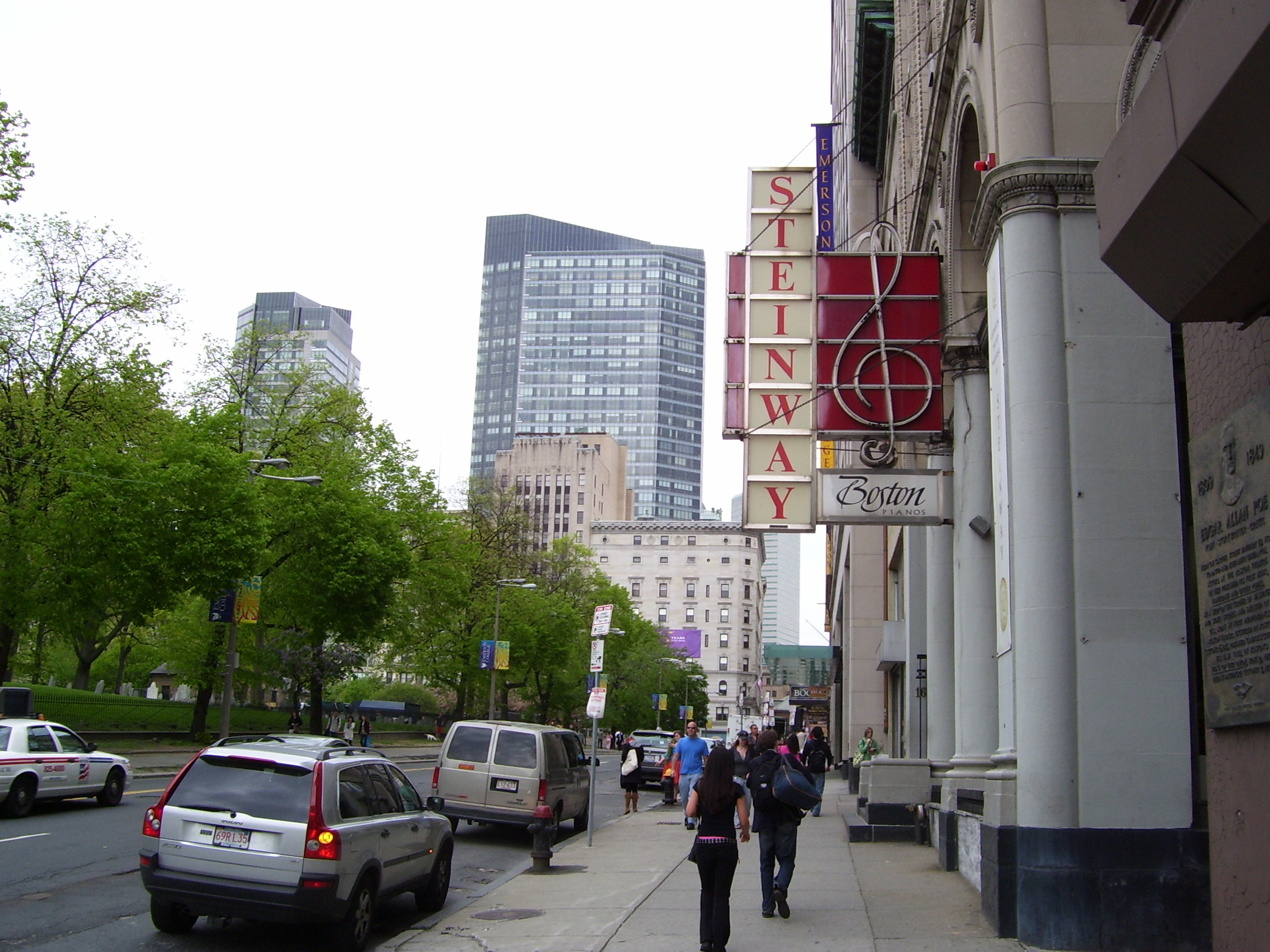

- Location within Boston Location within Massachusetts Location within the United States
- Location: Boston, Massachusetts
- Coordinates: 42°21′8″N 71°3′55″W
- Architect: Multiple
- Architectural style: Late 19th And Early 20th Century American Movements, Late 19th And 20th Century Revivals, Late Victorian
- MPS: Boston Theatre MRA
- NRHP reference No.: 80000458
- Added to NRHP: December 9, 1980

The Piano Row District is a historic district encompassing two blocks of buildings facing Boston Common at the corner of Tremont Street and Boylston Street in Boston, Massachusetts. The district extends along Boylston from Park Square to Tremont, and along Tremont to Avery Street. The district also includes two buildings on Tremont just south of Boylston: the Cutler Majestic Theater, and the 1925 Union Savings Bank building at 216-218 Tremont. This area was developed in the late 19th and early 20th centuries, and became known as "Piano Row" because of the concentration of music-related businesses, including several piano showrooms. The flagship store for M. Steinert and Sons, Boston's longtime Steinway dealer, has been located here since 1896, and features a fine underground performance hall, which has unfortunately been virtually abandoned due to fire codes.

The district was added to the National Register of Historic Places in 1980.

== See also ==
- National Register of Historic Places listings in northern Boston, Massachusetts
