= Hotel Touraine =

Hotel in Boston, Massachusetts, US

Coordinates: 42°21′8.44″N 71°3′51.91″W

Hotel Touraine in Boston, Massachusetts, was a residential hotel on the corner of Tremont Street and Boylston Street, near the Boston Common, which operated between 1897 and 1966. The architecture firm of Winslow and Wetherell designed the 11-story building in the Jacobethan style, constructed of "brick and limestone;" its "baronial" appearance was "patterned inside and out after a 16th-century chateau of the dukes of Touraine." It had dining rooms and a circulating library. Owners included Joseph Reed Whipple and George A. Turain.

Directly across the street were the clandestine district headquarters of the Boston Communist Party mentioned in Herbert Philbrick's 1952 book "I Led 3 Lives".

Among the guests: explorer Ernest Shackleton, boxer Max Baer, actor Stanley Bell, Diamond Jim Brady, George Gershwin, Ernest Wadsworth Longfellow, Pietro Mascagni, Mitch Miller, Justice Oliver Wendell Holmes Jr., railroad builder and operator Sir William Cornelius Van Horne, and Henry Bradford Endicott. Events included an exhibition in the 1960s of the Boston Negro Artists Association, and performances by the "Theater Company of Boston." The hotel closed in 1966 and became an apartment building.

== Images ==
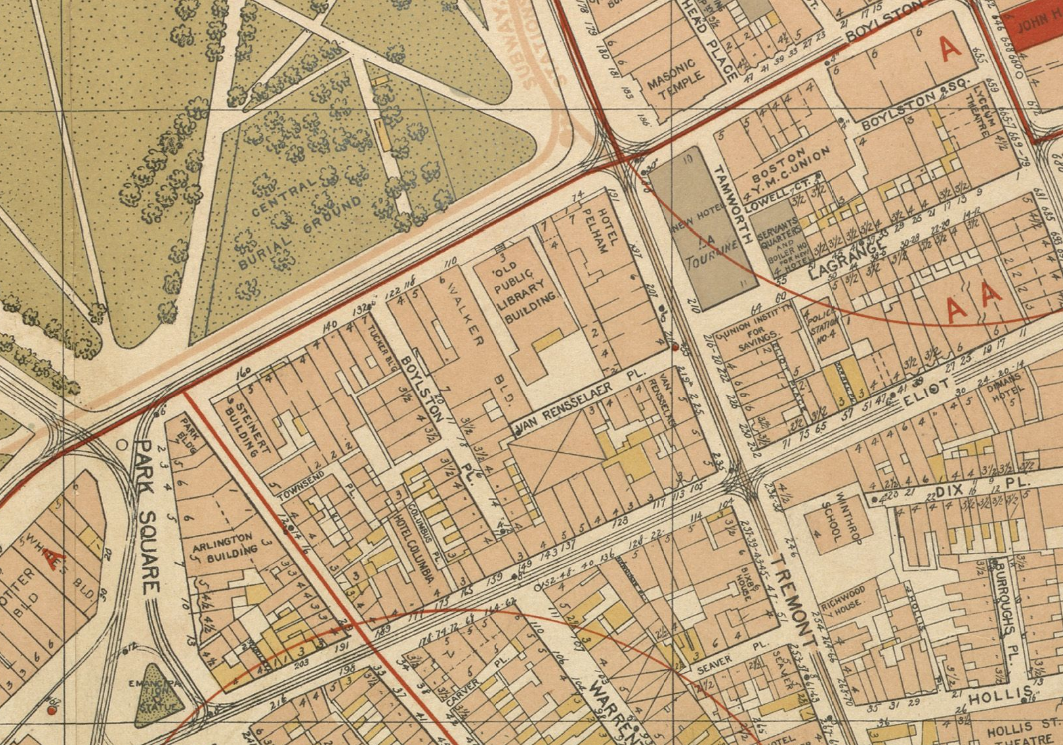
Detail of 1890s map of Boston, showing Hotel Touraine

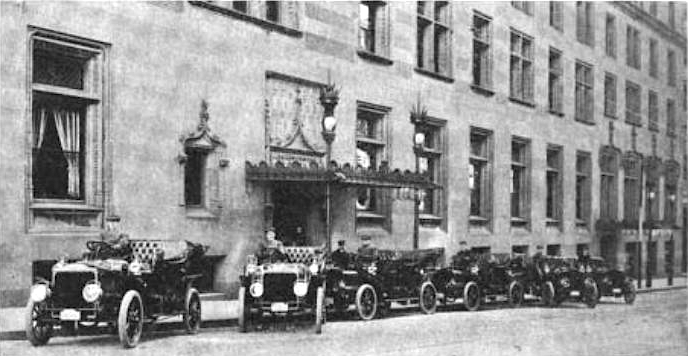
The hotel's fleet of chauffeured cars, 1906

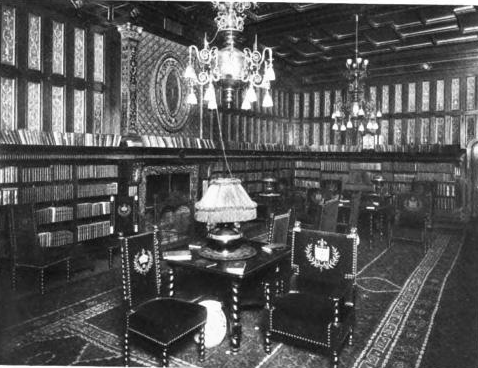
Hotel library, ca.1910

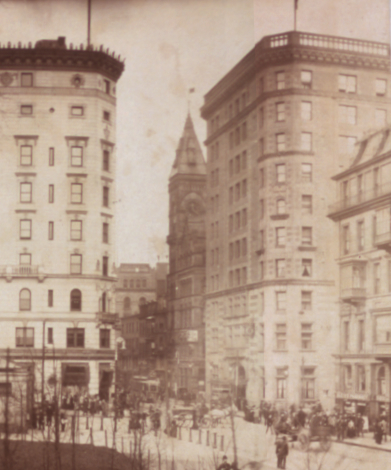
Hotel Touraine (at right), Masonic Temple (at left), 1903

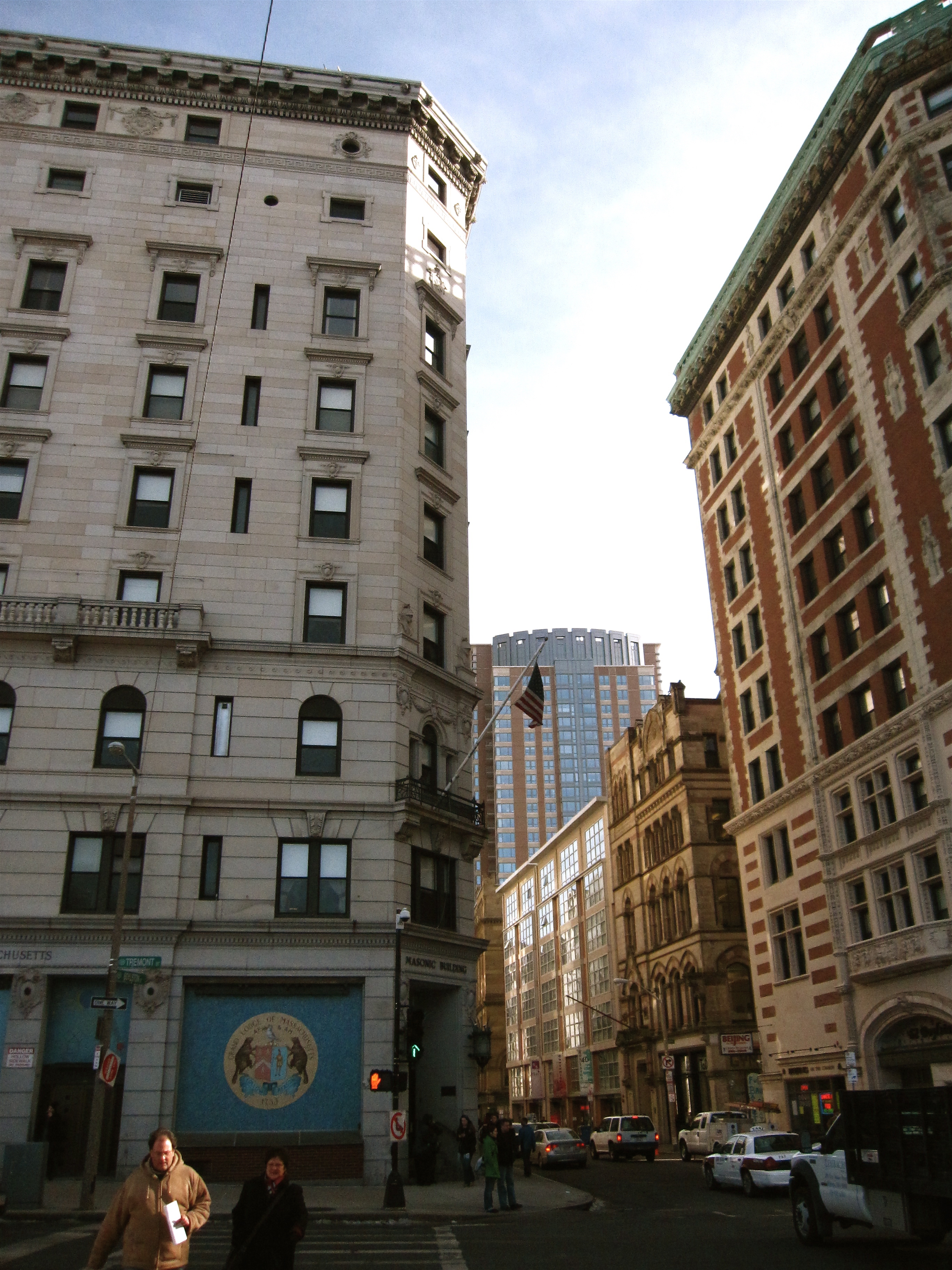
Former Hotel Touraine (at right), Masonic Temple (at left), 2010
