= The Beach Club (Rye, New Hampshire) =

- U.S. National Register of Historic Places
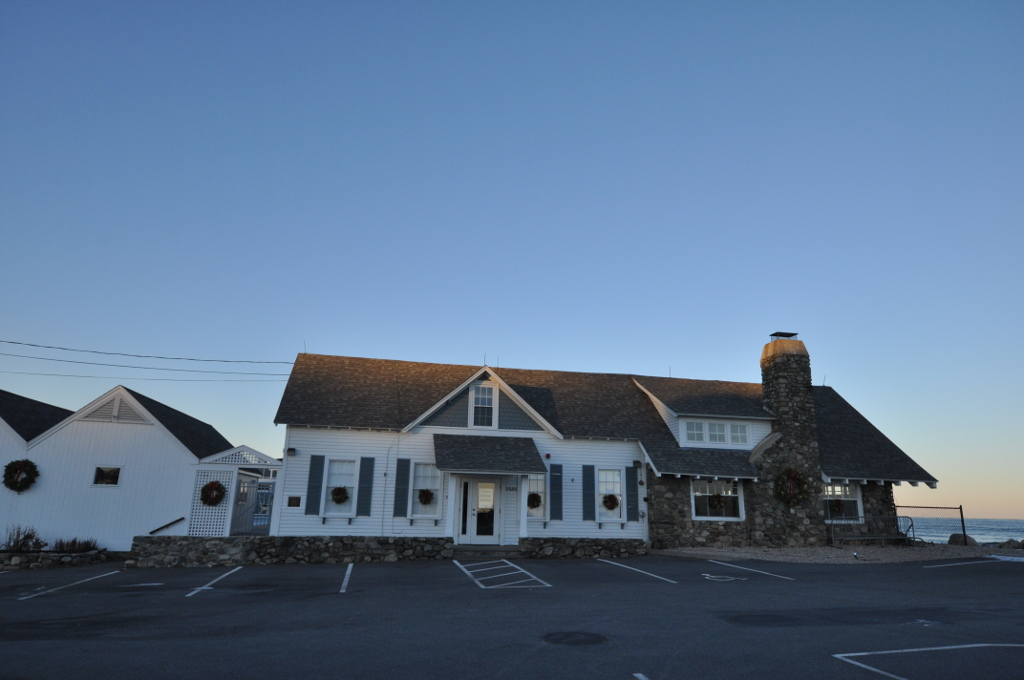

- Location within New Hampshire Location within the United States
- Location: 2450 Ocean Blvd., Rye, New Hampshire
- Coordinates: 42°58′41″N 70°45′55″W
- Built: 1925
- Architectural style: Shingle Style
- NRHP reference No.: 13000974
- Added to NRHP: December 24, 2013

The Beach Club is a private oceanfront club at 2450 Ocean Boulevard in Rye, New Hampshire. Founded in 1925, it is the only beachfront private club to survive from the early 20th century along New Hampshire's coast. It was listed on the National Register of Historic Places in 2013.

== Description and history ==
The Beach Club consists of a cluster of four buildings built around a saltwater swimming pool on the beach near the junction of Ocean Boulevard (New Hampshire Route 1A) and Sea Road. The main clubhouse, facing roughly south, is a single-story frame structure with modest Victorian styling, to which a stone addition was made on the east side. The frame portion is five bays wide, with a shed-roof portico sheltering the center entrance. The stone addition is two bays wide, with a chimney prominently rising at the center of its facade. The interior has open timber-frame woodwork, with kitchen and service facilities in modern additions to the north. Surrounding the saltwater pool are three bathhouses, which house changing rooms and service equipment and storage for the pool. On the east side of the pool is a covered cabana-like area with views of the ocean.

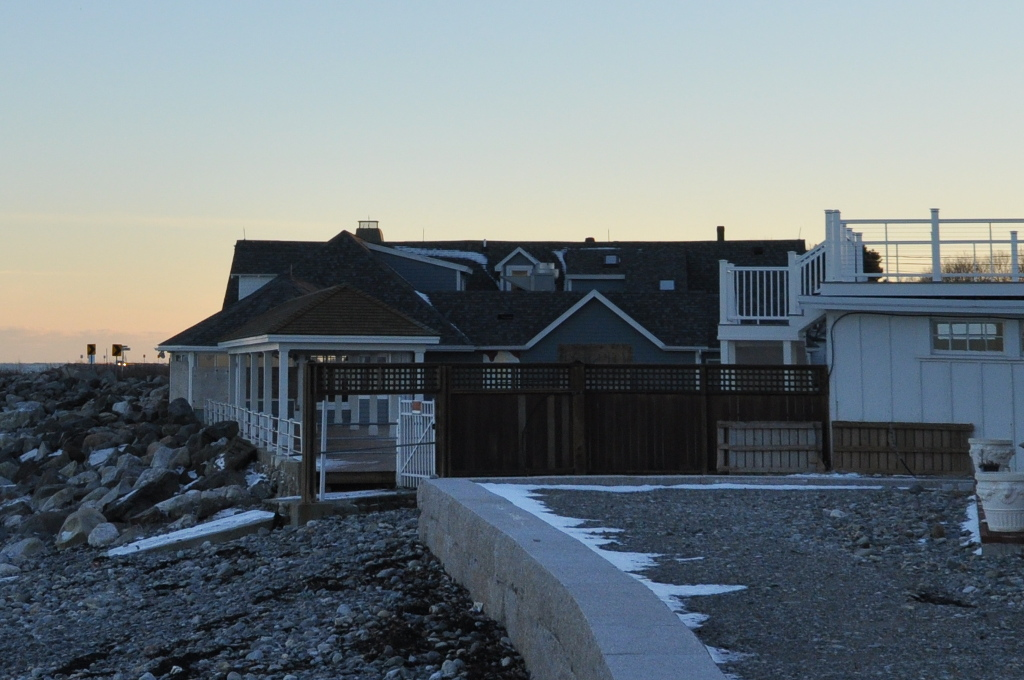

The main clubhouse was built c. 1882, and has been repeatedly modified since then. It originally was run as a concession to all local visitors. The oldest of the bathhouses was built about 1900 by this business. It became a private club in 1925, catering to the elite of New Hampshire and Massachusetts, who felt their summer resort was becoming overrun by a less savory and more transient type of visitor. Prominent leaders of the club included Massachusetts Governor Alvan T. Fuller, who had a summer residence nearby. The swimming pool was originally built in 1927 by the club, and was replaced in 2007. It features an underwater lighting system that is a near replica of one the original pool had.

== See also ==
- National Register of Historic Places listings in Rockingham County, New Hampshire
