= Old New England Building =

- U.S. National Register of Historic Places
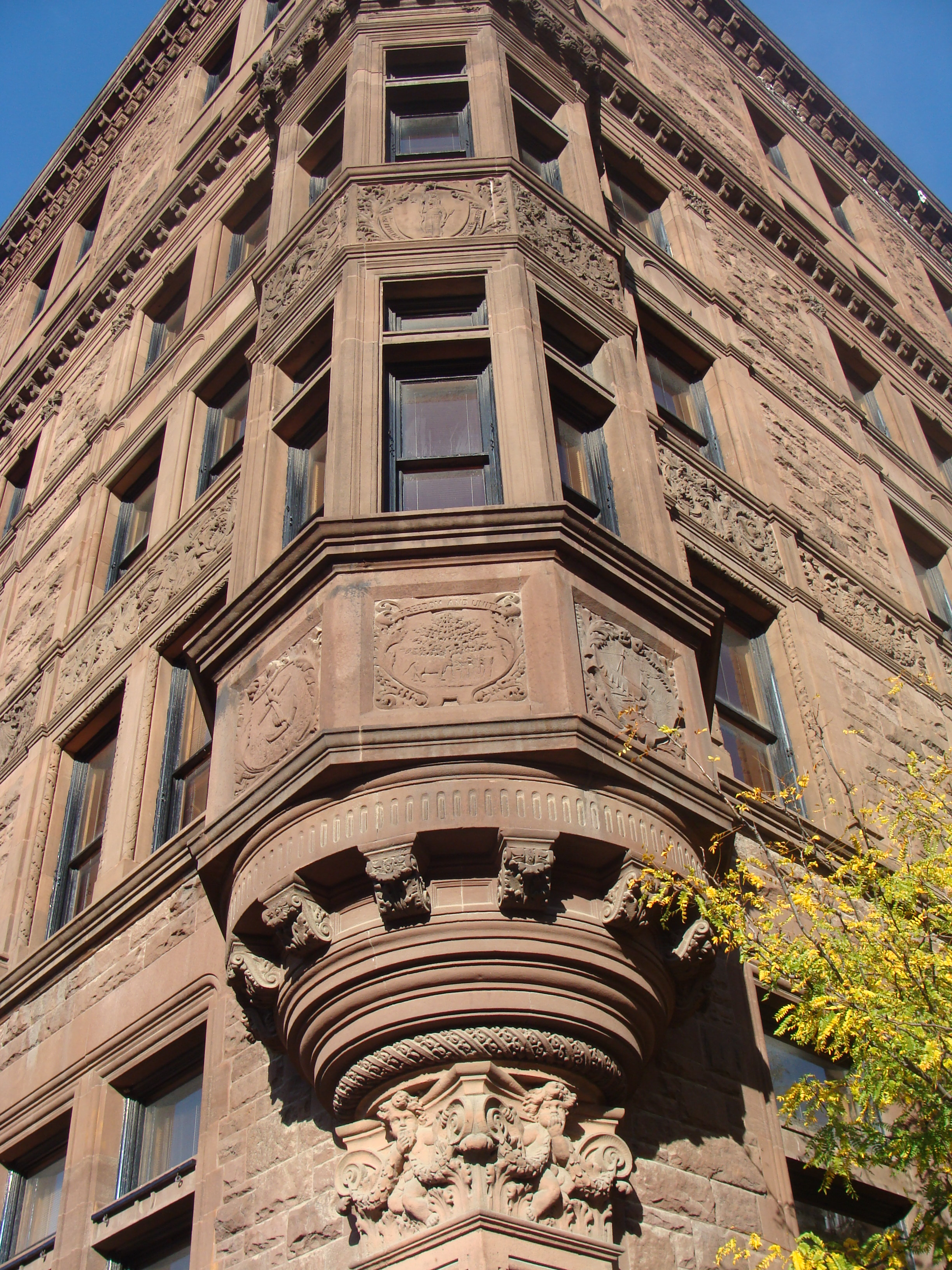

- Location within Missouri Location within the United States
- Location: 112 W. 9th St., Kansas City, Missouri
- Coordinates: 39°06′14″N 94°35′06″W
- Area: 9.9 acres (4.0 ha)
- Built: 1886
- Architect: Bradlee, Winslow & Wetherell
- Architectural style: Renaissance
- NRHP reference No.: 73001040
- Added to NRHP: October 25, 1973

The Old New England Building in the Library District of Downtown Kansas City, Missouri, located at 112 West 9th Street, was built in 1886 as the offices of the New England Safe Deposit and Trust Company. It was listed on the National Register of Historic Places in 1973.
