= Rye, New Hampshire =

- Town
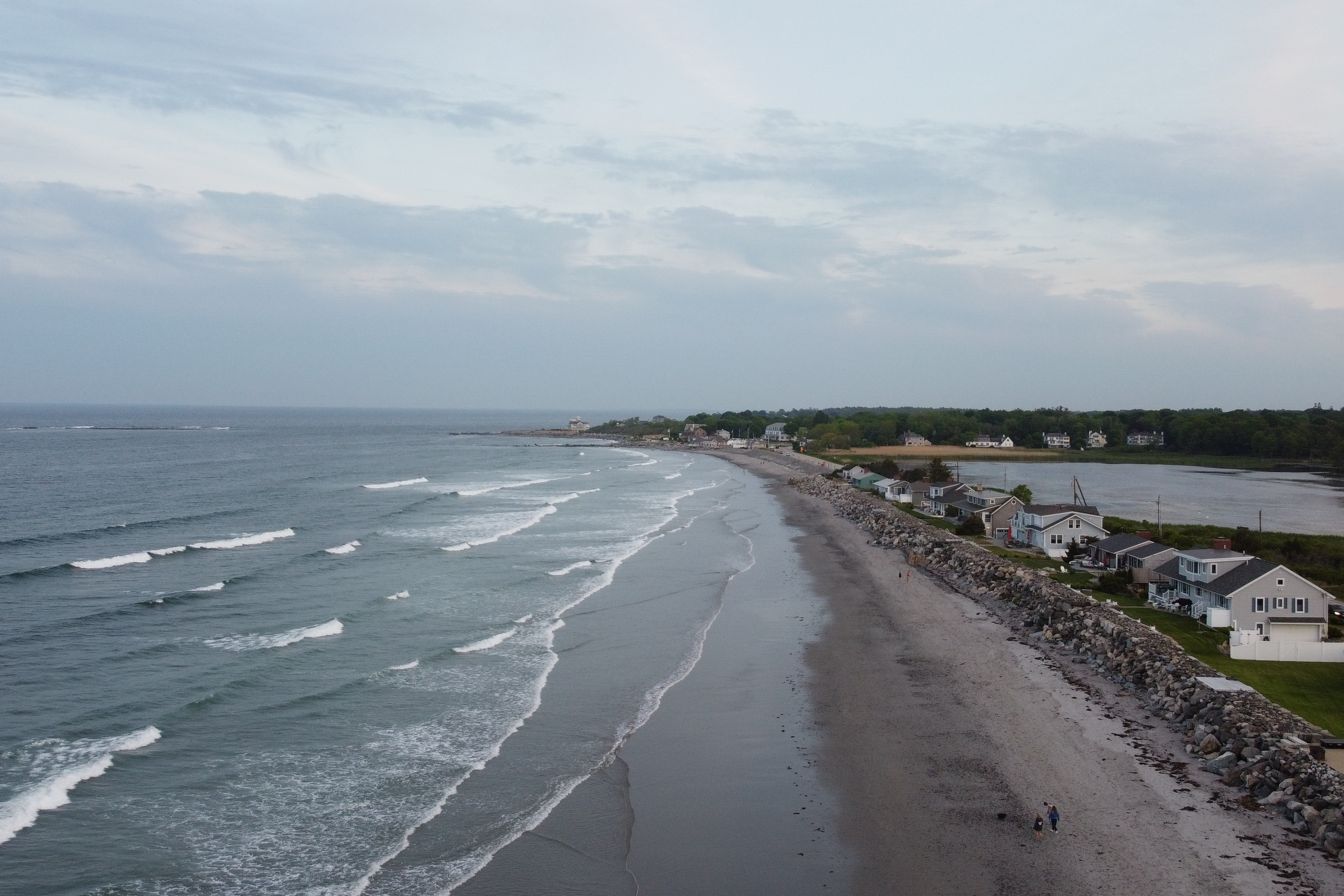
- Jenness State Beach at sunset

- Flag Seal

- Location in Rockingham County and the state of New Hampshire
- Coordinates: 43°00′48″N 70°46′15″W
- Country: United States
- State: New Hampshire
- County: Rockingham
- Founded: 1623
- Incorporated: 1785
- Villages: List: Rye; Rye Beach; Rye Harbor; Cable Road; Fairhill Manor; Foyes Corner; Langs Corner; West Rye

Area
  - Total: 36.8 sq mi (95.2 km^{2})
  - Land: 12.6 sq mi (32.7 km^{2})
  - Water: 24.1 sq mi (62.5 km^{2}) 65.63%
- Elevation: 0 ft (0 m)

Population (2020)
  - Total: 5,543
  - Density: 438/sq mi (169.3/km^{2})
- Time zone: UTC−5 (Eastern)
  - Summer (DST): UTC−4 (Eastern)
- ZIP Codes: 03870 (Rye); 03871 (Rye Beach)
- Area code: 603
- FIPS code: 33-66180
- GNIS feature ID: 873712
- Website: www.town.rye.nh.us

Rye is a town in Rockingham County, New Hampshire, United States. The population was 5,543 at the 2020 census. The town is home to several state parks along the Atlantic coastline.

== History ==
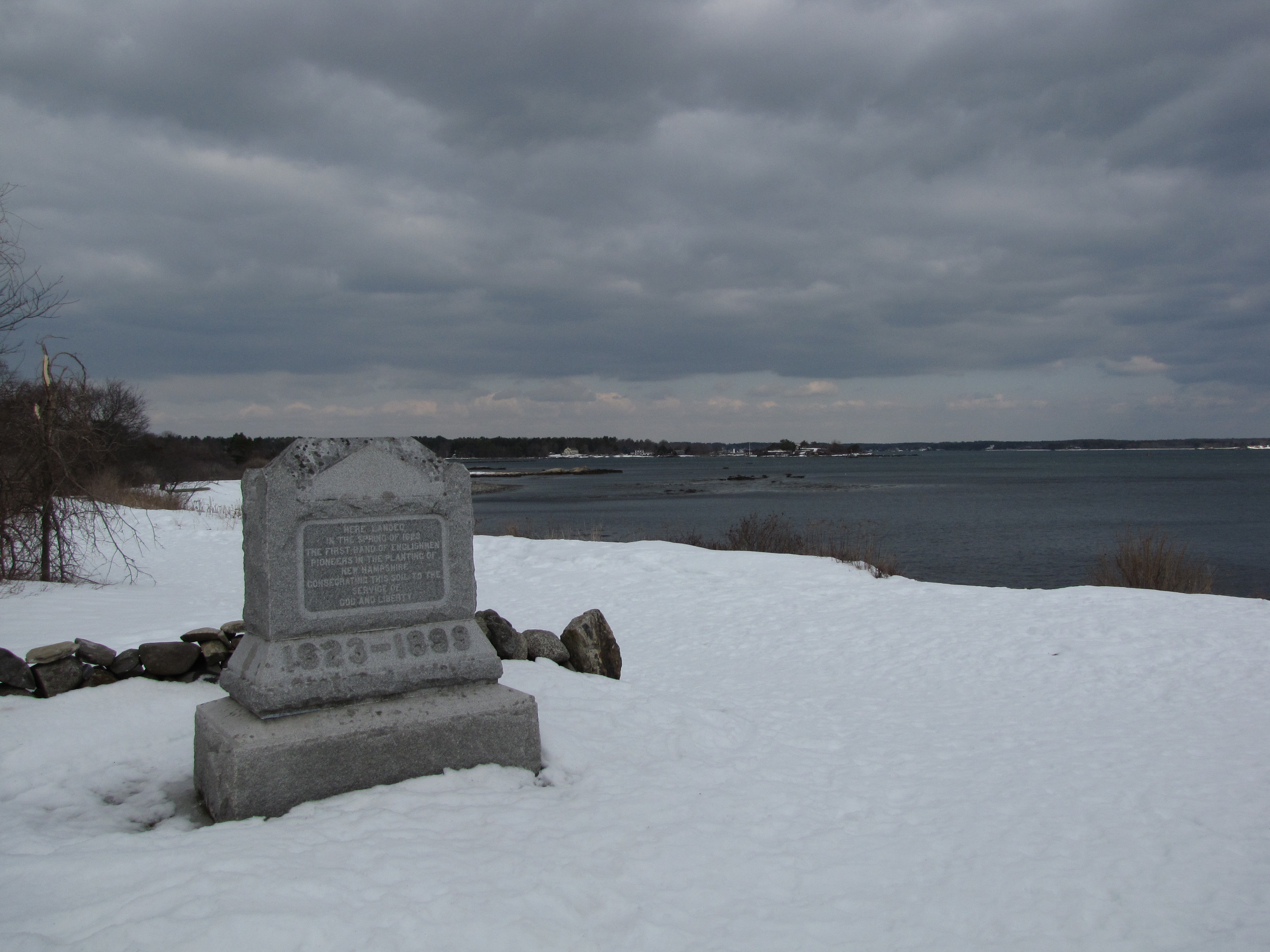
1899 monument marking presumed landing place of 1623

The first settlement in New Hampshire, originally named Pannaway Plantation, was established in 1623, at Odiorne's Point by a group of fishermen led by David Thompson. The settlement was abandoned in favor of Strawbery Banke, which became Portsmouth. The first settler in present-day Rye was probably William Berry. Prior to its incorporation in 1726 as a parish of New Castle, Rye was called "Sandy Beach" and its lands were once parts of New Castle, Portsmouth, Greenland and Hampton. In September 1691, a band of Wabanaki Indians attacked Sandy Beach in a raid during King William's War in what was called the Brackett Lane Massacre. In 1726, the town of New Castle set off a parish for Sandy Beach called "Rye", for Rye in Sussex, England, the ancestral lands of the Jenness family who continue to live in the town to this day and even have a beach named after them. The town was incorporated in 1785. In 2013, a researcher pointed out that the town seal showed the parish creation date of 1726 as the incorporation date. Later on in the year, the seal was updated to include the three dates important to Rye, 1623, 1726 and 1785.

== Geography ==
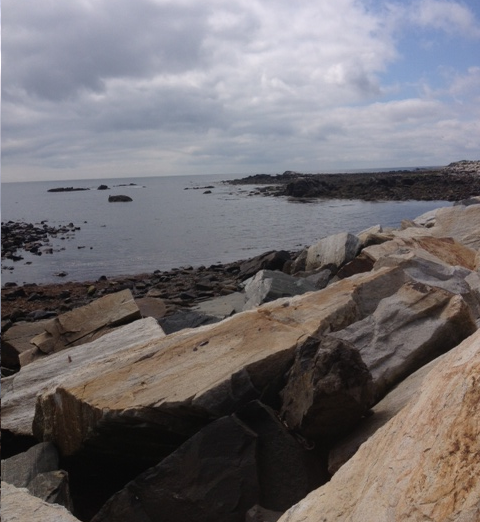
Rock formation near Odiorne Point

According to the United States Census Bureau, the town has a total area of 36.8 square miles (95.2 km^{2}), of which 12.6 square miles (32.7 km^{2}) are land and 24.1 square miles (62.5 km^{2}) are water, comprising 65.63% of the town. The town is located on the shore of the Atlantic Ocean and includes four of the nine islands known as the Isles of Shoals, which lie approximately 10 miles (16 km) out from the mainland. The highest point in Rye is the summit of Breakfast Hill, at 151 feet (46 m) above sea level, on the town's border with Greenland.

State parks in Rye along the Atlantic shoreline include (from south to north) Jenness State Beach, Rye Harbor State Park, Wallis Sands State Beach, and 135-acre (55 ha) Odiorne Point State Park, home to the Seacoast Science Center.

Route 1A, going north–south, follows the coast. Short segments of U.S. Route 1 and Route 1B pass through Rye. The nearest major highway is I-95, with the closest two exits in Hampton and Portsmouth. The nearest commercial airport is Portsmouth International Airport at Pease; the two closest major airports are Logan Airport in Boston and Portland International Jetport in Maine.

The village of Rye Beach is in the southern part of the town. Rye Beach has its own U.S. post office, as well as its own zoning enforcement and planning regulations.

=== Adjacent municipalities ===
- Portsmouth (northwest)
- New Castle (northeast)
- Kittery, Maine (northeast)
- North Hampton (southwest)
- Greenland (west)

== Demographics ==
Historical population
Census	Pop.	Note	%±
1790	865		—
1800	890		2.9%
1810	1,020		14.6%
1820	1,127		10.5%
1830	1,172		4.0%
1840	1,205		2.8%
1850	1,295		7.5%
1860	1,199		−7.4%
1870	993		−17.2%
1880	1,111		11.9%
1890	978		−12.0%
1900	1,142		16.8%
1910	1,014		−11.2%
1920	1,196		17.9%
1930	1,081		−9.6%
1940	1,246		15.3%
1950	1,982		59.1%
1960	3,244		63.7%
1970	4,083		25.9%
1980	4,508		10.4%
1990	4,612		2.3%
2000	5,182		12.4%
2010	5,298		2.2%
2020	5,543		4.6%
U.S. Decennial Census

As of the census of 2010, there were 5,298 people, 2,252 households, and 1,531 families residing in the town. There were 2,852 housing units, of which 600, or 21.0%, were vacant. 471 of the vacant units were for seasonal or vacation use. The racial makeup of the town was 97.8% white, 0.3% African American, 0.02% Native American, 0.9% Asian, 0.04% Native Hawaiian or Pacific Islander, 0.2% some other race, and 0.8% from two or more races. 1.1% of the population were Hispanic or Latino of any race.

Of the 2,252 households, 26.3% had children under the age of 18 living with them, 56.3% were headed by married couples living together, 8.1% had a female householder with no husband present, and 32.0% were non-families. Of all households, 25.4% were made up of individuals, and 10.9% were someone living alone who was 65 years of age or older. The average household size was 2.34, and the average family size was 2.80.

In the town, 20.3% of the population were under the age of 18, 4.3% were from 18 to 24, 18.2% from 25 to 44, 37.5% from 45 to 64, and 19.7% were 65 years of age or older. The median age was 48.8 years. For every 100 females, there were 95.1 males. For every 100 females age 18 and over, there were 93.8 males.

For the period 2012–2016, the estimated median annual income for a household was $99,417, and the median income for a family was $122,064. Male full-time workers had a median income of $60,368 versus $50,588 for females. The per capita income for the town was $60,071. 5.1% of the population and 2.3% of families were below the poverty line. 4.4% of the population under the age of 18 and 5.6% of those 65 or older were living in poverty.

== Politics ==
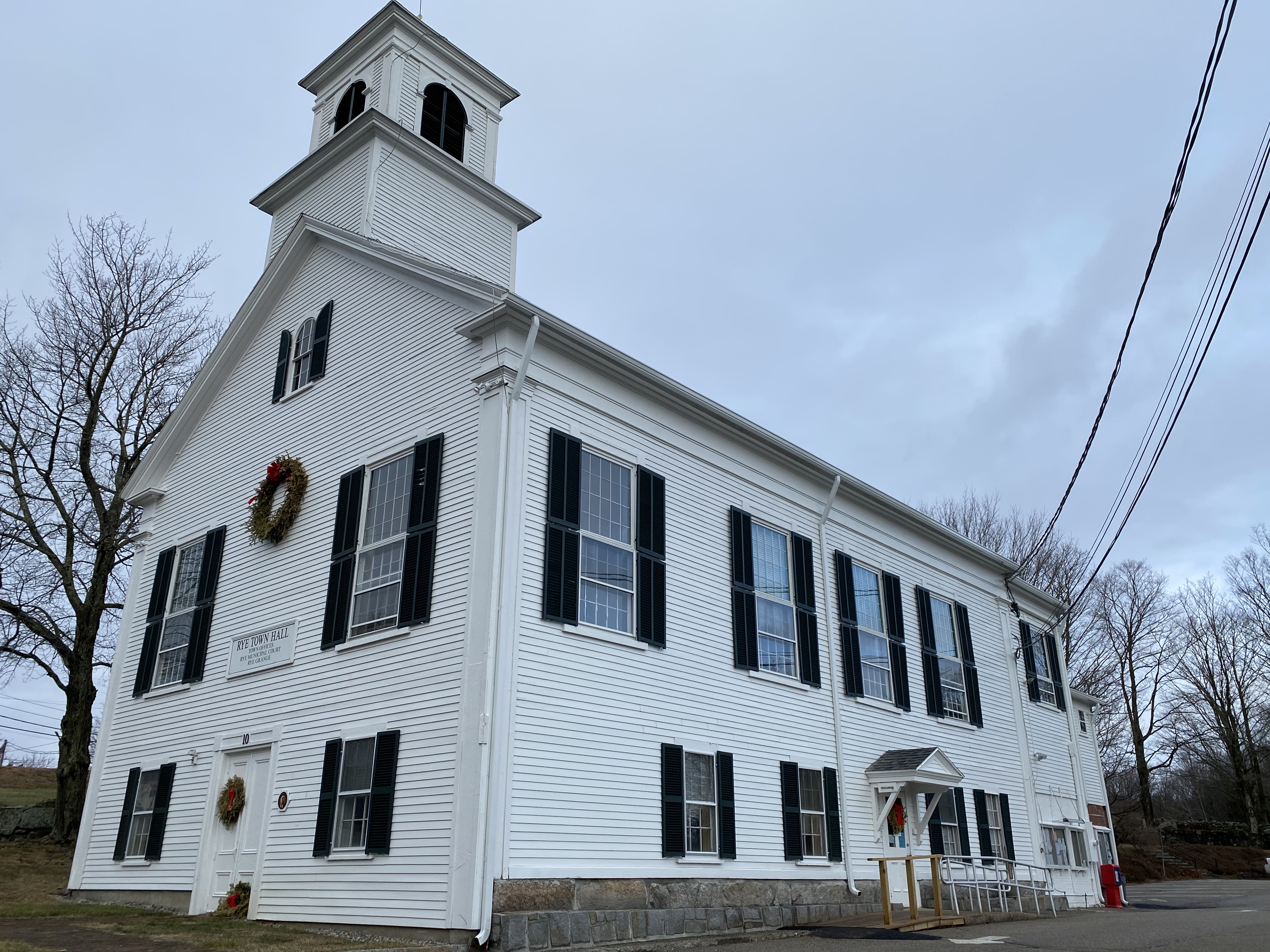
Rye Town Hall

As of September 1, 2021, 1,733 registered voters in Rye were registered as Democrats with 1,552 and 1,453 being registered as Republicans and undeclared, respectively.

In August 2001, a group of townspeople from Newington and Rye made a plea in protest to the state legislature to consider allowing the town to secede from the state due to disproportionate property tax laws which had been passed by the state in 1997 to balance the state's education economy. The dispute was largely quelled by the lack of support for the movement, as only 52 of Newington's 700+ (and 100 of Rye's 5,000) residents signed the petition. The property tax issue itself quieted as Governor Craig Benson announced in 2003 the property taxes would be cut almost by half by 2008.

== Education ==
Children who live in Rye can attend public schools in town from kindergarten through eighth grade. School Administrative Unit 50 (SAU-50) is the school district that serves Rye, as well as the towns of Greenland, Newington, and New Castle. High school students from Rye attend Portsmouth High School.

Rye Elementary School is home to kindergarten through fifth grade and is the first and largest school students from Rye will attend in SAU-50. All grades are co-ed and the school has an 11 to 1 student per teacher ratio with three hundred and thirty students enrolled in October 2013. Rye Junior High handles grades six, seven, and eight. The neighboring town of New Castle sends its students to Rye Junior High after sixth grade, but only contributes a few students to each year's seventh grade class. All grades are coed and contain two hundred and twenty students as of October 2013 with a ratio of nine students to each teacher.

There are two private pre-schools in the town. Rye Country Day is the larger of the two pre-schools in town, currently enrolling one hundred and forty students (as of October 2013). The second, The Children's House Montessori school, is located at 80 Sagamore Road and has a student per teacher ratio of eleven to one.

Learning Skills Academy is a private non-profit school catering to students with learning capabilities. The organization has a location at 1237 Washington Road in Rye and accepts students in fifth through eleventh grade, as well as third. 32 kids make up the student body at the Rye location as of October 2013.

== Notable people ==
- Craig Benson (born 1954), 79th governor of New Hampshire
- William Berry (1610–1654), first settler of Rye
- Dan Brown (born 1964), author (The Da Vinci Code)
- Scott Brown (born 1959), former U.S. senator from Massachusetts
- Gary Culliss (born 1970), entrepreneur
- Judd Gregg (born 1947), 76th governor of New Hampshire and U.S. senator
- Chip Kelly (born 1963), head football coach, UCLA Bruins
- Dave O'Brien (born 1963), ESPN play-by-play announcer
- Herbert Philbrick (1915–1993), advertising executive, business owner in Rye
- Laurence Tosi (born 1968), Chief Financial Officer of Airbnb
- Maynard L. Young Jr. (1924–2009), member of the New Hampshire House of Representatives

== Sites of interest ==
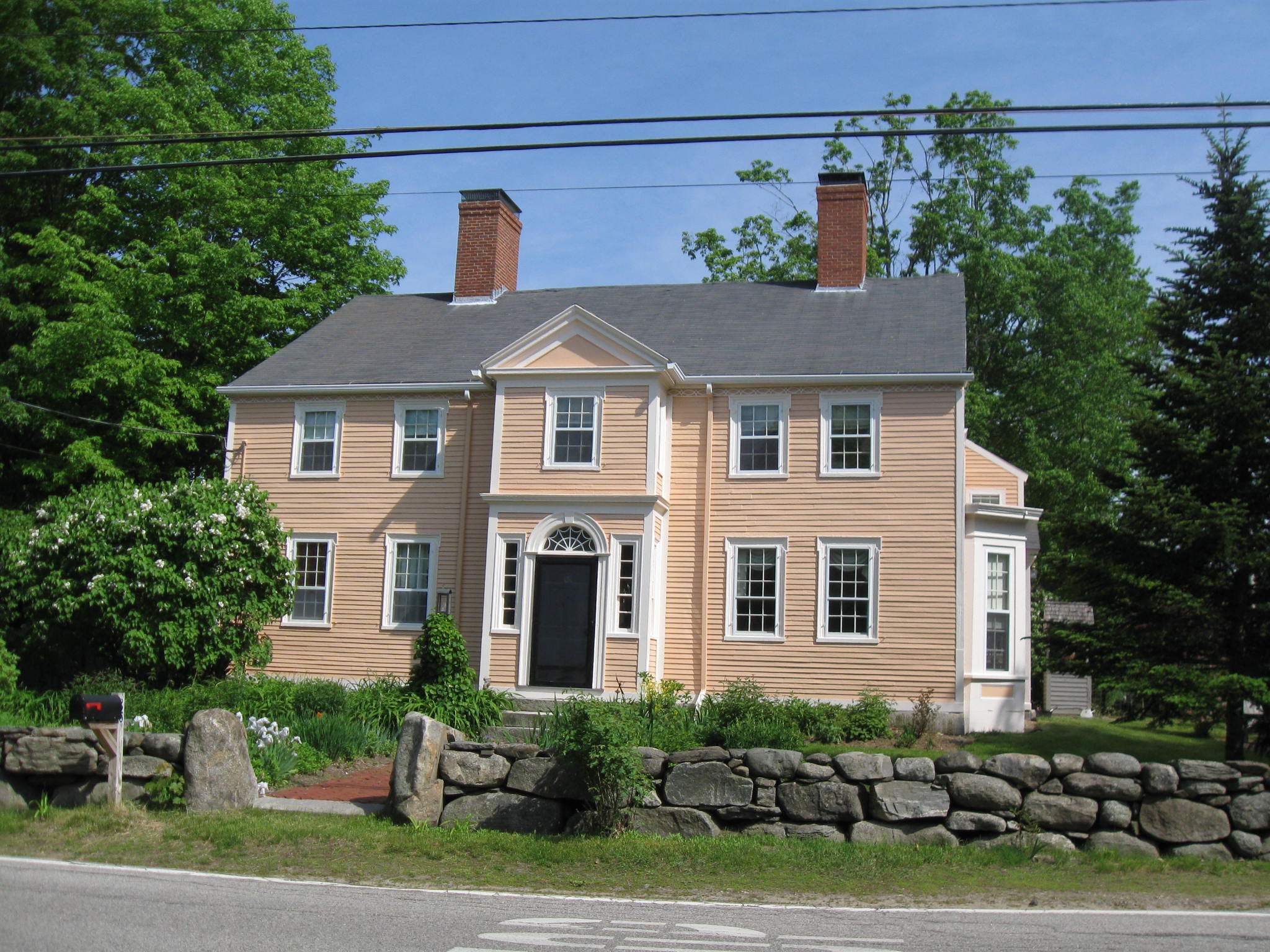
Parsons Homestead

The town has six structures listed on the National Register of Historic Places:

- The Beach Club
- Elijah Locke House
- Parsons Homestead
- Pulpit Rock Tower
- Rye Town Hall
- St. Andrew's-by-the-Sea

The Isles of Shoals are designated as a U.S. Historic District.

== In popular culture ==
Rye was the setting (in part) of the short story "Marjorie Daw" by Thomas Bailey Aldrich (1836–1907).
