= Jenness State Beach =

Park in Rye, New Hampshire, United States

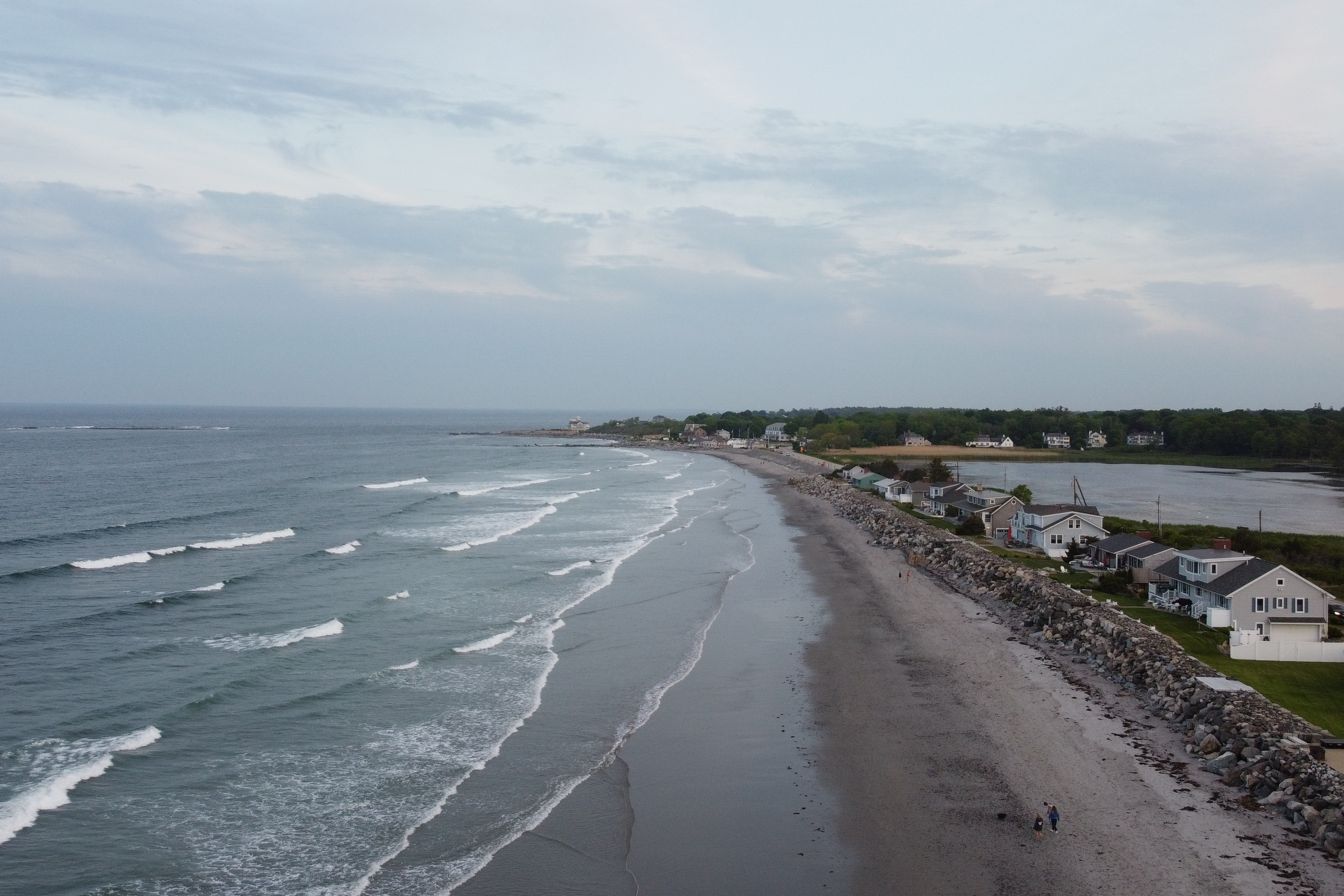
- Jenness Beach by drone camera, June 2020
- Interactive map of Jenness State Beach
- Location: Rye, New Hampshire, United States
- Coordinates: 42°59′08″N 70°45′43″W
- Area: 1.3 acres (0.53 ha)
- Elevation: 3 feet (0.91 m)
- Established: 1980
- Administrator: New Hampshire Division of Parks and Recreation
- Website: Official website
New Hampshire State Parks
Jenness State Beach
- Location within New Hampshire

Jenness State Beach is a small state park located on the Atlantic Ocean in the town of Rye, New Hampshire. The park offers swimming at a sandy beach with a bathhouse and picnicking. The parking lot can accommodate 67 cars.
