= Mortara case =

Italian cause célèbre of the 1850s and 1860s

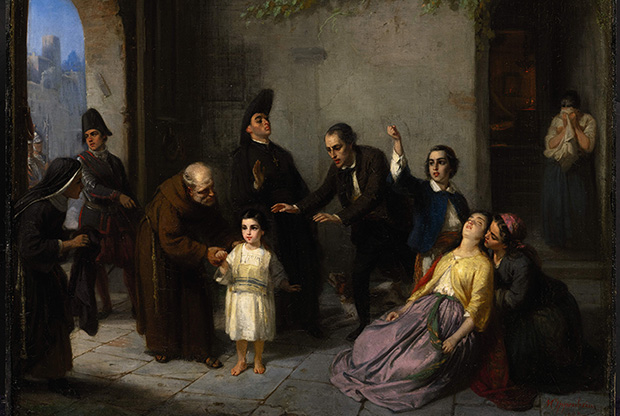
The Kidnapping of Edgardo Mortara, painting by Moritz Daniel Oppenheim, 1862. This representation departs significantly from the historical record of how Mortara was taken – no clergy were present, for example.

The Mortara case (Italian: caso Mortara) was an Italian cause célèbre that captured the attention of much of Europe and North America in the 1850s and 1860s. It concerned the Papal States' seizure of a six-year-old boy named Edgardo Mortara from his Jewish family in Bologna, on the basis of a former servant's testimony that she had administered an emergency baptism to the boy when he fell ill as an infant. Mortara grew up as a Catholic under the protection of Pope Pius IX, who refused his parents' desperate pleas for his return. Mortara eventually became a priest. The domestic and international outrage against the Papal State's actions contributed to its downfall amid the unification of Italy.

In late 1857, Bologna's inquisitor, Father Pier Feletti, heard that Anna Morisi, who had worked in the Mortara house for six years, had secretly baptised Edgardo when she had thought he was about to die as a baby. The Supreme Sacred Congregation of the Roman and Universal Inquisition held the view that the action irrevocably made the child a Catholic and, because the law of the Papal States forbade the raising of Christians by members of other faiths, it ordered that he be taken from his family and brought up by the Church. Police went to the Mortara home late on 23 June 1858, and took custody of Edgardo the following evening.

After the child's father was allowed to visit him during August and September 1858, two starkly different narratives emerged: one told of a boy who wanted to return to his family and the faith of his ancestors, while the other described a child who had learned the catechism perfectly and wanted his parents to become Catholics as well. International protests mounted, but the Pope would not be moved. After pontifical rule in Bologna ended in 1859, Feletti was prosecuted for his role in Mortara's kidnapping, but he was acquitted when the court decided that he had not acted on his own initiative. With the Pope as a substitute father, Mortara trained for the priesthood in Rome until the Kingdom of Italy captured the city in 1870, ending the existence of the Papal States. Leaving the country, Mortara was ordained in France three years later, at the age of 21. He spent most of his life outside Italy and died in Belgium in 1940, aged 88.

Several historians highlight the affair as one of the most significant events in Pius IX's papacy, and they juxtapose his handling of it in 1858 with the loss of most of his territory a year later. The case notably altered the policy of the French Emperor Napoleon III, who shifted from opposing the movement for Italian unification to actively supporting it. The traditional Italian historiography of the country's unification does not give much prominence to the Mortara case which, by the late 20th century, was mostly remembered by Jewish scholars. A 1997 study by the American historian David Kertzer has marked the start of a wider re-examination of it.

== Background ==
=== Political context ===
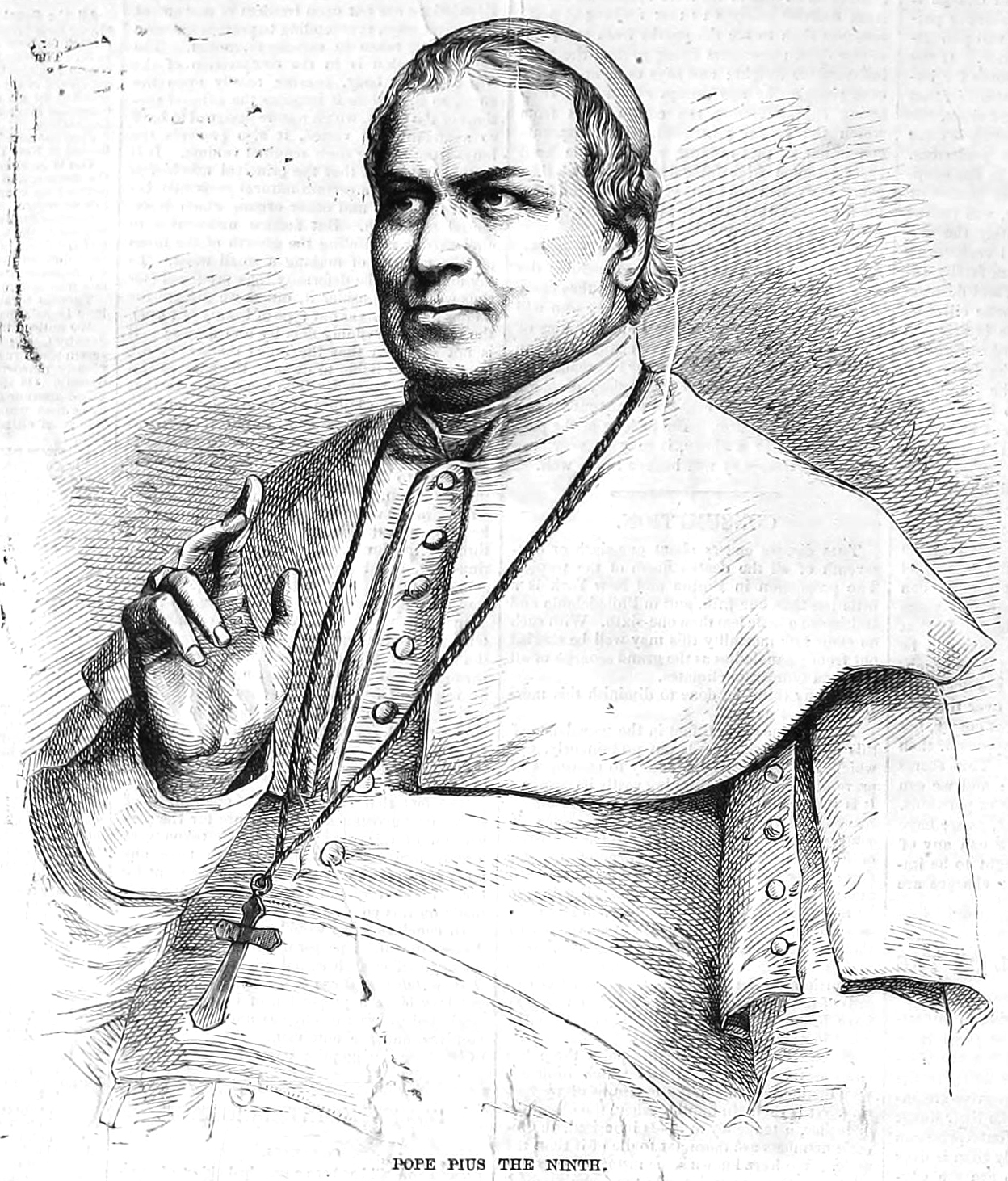
Pope Pius IX (r. 1846–1878), depicted in Harper's Weekly in 1867

Map of the Italian states in 1843. The Papal States had their capital in Rome.

For more than a millennium, starting around 754, the Papal States were territories in Italy under the direct and sovereign rule of the pope. Ecclesiastical rule over Central Italy started when Frankish King Pepin the Short donated its territories in the centre of the peninsula to Pope Stephen II. The Catholic Church's control over Rome and a neighbouring swathe of central Italy was generally seen as a manifestation of the pontiff's secular, "temporal" power, as opposed to his ecclesiastical primacy.

After the end of the Napoleonic Wars in 1815, the other main Italian states were the Grand Duchy of Tuscany in the west, the Kingdom of the Two Sicilies in the south, the Kingdom of Sardinia (governed from Piedmont, on the mainland) and the Kingdom of Lombardy–Venetia in the North East (under direct Austrian authority); minor entities were the Duchy of Parma and Piacenza and the Duchy of Modena and Reggio, both in Emilia. The French occupation during the 1790s and early 1800s had greatly increased the Pope's popularity and spiritual authority, but had also severely damaged the geopolitical credibility of the Papal States. The historian David Kertzer suggests that, by the 1850s, "what had once appeared so solid – a product of the divine order of things – now seemed terribly fragile".

Pope Pius IX, elected in 1846, was initially widely seen as a great reformer and a liberal moderniser, who might throw his weight behind the growing movement for unification of Italy – referred to in Italian as the Risorgimento (meaning "Resurgence"). When the revolutions of 1848 broke out, however, he refused to support a pan-Italian campaign against the Austrian Empire, which controlled Lombardy–Venetia in the north-east. That triggered a popular uprising in the Papal States, Pope Pius's flight to Gaeta, then belonging to the Two Sicilies, and the proclamation in 1849 of the short-lived Roman Republic, which was crushed by Austrian and French intervention in support of the Pope. Rome was thereafter guarded by French troops, and Austrians garrisoned the rest of the Papal States, much to the resentment of most of the inhabitants. Pope Pius shared the traditional pontifical view that the Papal States were essential to his independence as head of the Catholic Church. He regained some of his popularity during the 1850s, but the drive for Italian unification, spearheaded by the Kingdom of Sardinia, continued to unsettle him.

The Jews of the Papal States, numbering 15,000 or so in 1858, were grateful to Pope Pius IX because he had ended the long-standing legal obligation for them to attend sermons in church four times a year, based on that week's Torah portion and aimed at their conversion to Christianity. On 17 April 1848, he had also torn down the gates of the Roman Ghetto, despite the objections of many Christians. However, Jews continued to be subject to many restrictions and the vast majority still lived in the ghetto. After returning from exile in 1850, during which the Roman Republic had issued sharp anti-Church measures, the Pope issued a series of anti-liberal measures, including re-instituting the Ghetto.

=== Mortara and Morisi ===
Edgardo Levi Mortara, (Note: Edgardo's full name is variously recorded as Edgardo Levi Mortara, which he is on record as stating himself in adulthood, Edgardo Mortara Levi, or simply Edgardo Mortara.) the sixth of eight children born to Salomone "Momolo" Mortara, a Jewish merchant, and his wife Marianna (née Padovani), was born on 27 August 1851 in Bologna, one of the Papal Legations in the far north of the pontifical state. In 1850, the family had moved from the Duchy of Modena, just west of Bologna. Bologna's Jewish population of about 900 had been expelled in 1593 by Pope Clement VIII. Some Jews, mostly merchants like Edgardo's father, had started to settle in Bologna again during the 1790s and, by 1858, there was a Jewish community of about 200 in the city. The Jews of Bologna practised Judaism discreetly, with neither a rabbi nor a synagogue. The Papal States officially forbade them to have Christian servants, but observant Jewish families perceived gentile maids as essential because they were not covered by Jewish laws, and thus provided a way for Jews to have household tasks carried out while still observing their Sabbath. In practice, Church authorities turned a blind eye, and almost every Jewish family in Bologna employed at least one Catholic woman.

A few months after Edgardo's birth, the Mortara family engaged a new servant: Anna "Nina" Morisi, a 14-year-old Catholic from the nearby village of San Giovanni in Persiceto. Like all her family and friends, Morisi was illiterate. She had come to the city following her three sisters, to work and save money towards a dowry so she could eventually marry. In early 1855, Morisi became pregnant, which was not uncommon for unmarried servants in Bologna at that time. Many employers would simply sack girls in such situations, but the Mortaras did not. They paid for Morisi to spend the last four months of her pregnancy at a midwife's home and deliver the child, then had her return to work with them. To protect Morisi and themselves from embarrassment, they told neighbours that their maid was sick and recuperating at home. Morisi gave her newborn baby to an orphanage, which the Papal States required unwed mothers to do, then returned to work with the Mortaras. She remained there until she was hired by another Bologna family in 1857. Soon after that, she married and moved back to San Giovanni in Persiceto.

== Removal ==
=== Instigation ===
In October 1857, the inquisitor of Bologna, the Dominican friar Pier Gaetano Feletti, learned of rumours that a secret baptism had been administered to one of the city's Jewish children by a Catholic servant. If true, it would make the child a Catholic in the eyes of the Church, a fact with secular as well as spiritual ramifications, since the stance of the Church was that children who it considered to be Christian could not be raised by non-Christians, and should be removed from their parents in such circumstances. Cases like that were not uncommon in 19th-century Italy, and often revolved around the baptism of a Jewish child by a Christian servant. The official Church position was that Catholics should not baptise Jewish children without the parents' consent, except if a child was on the brink of death. In those cases, the Church considered the customary deferment to parental authority was outweighed by the importance of allowing the child's soul to be saved and go to Heaven, and permitted baptism without the parents' assent. Many Jewish families feared clandestine baptisms by their Christian maids and, to counter this threat, some households required Christians leaving their employment to sign notarised statements confirming that they had never baptised any of the children.

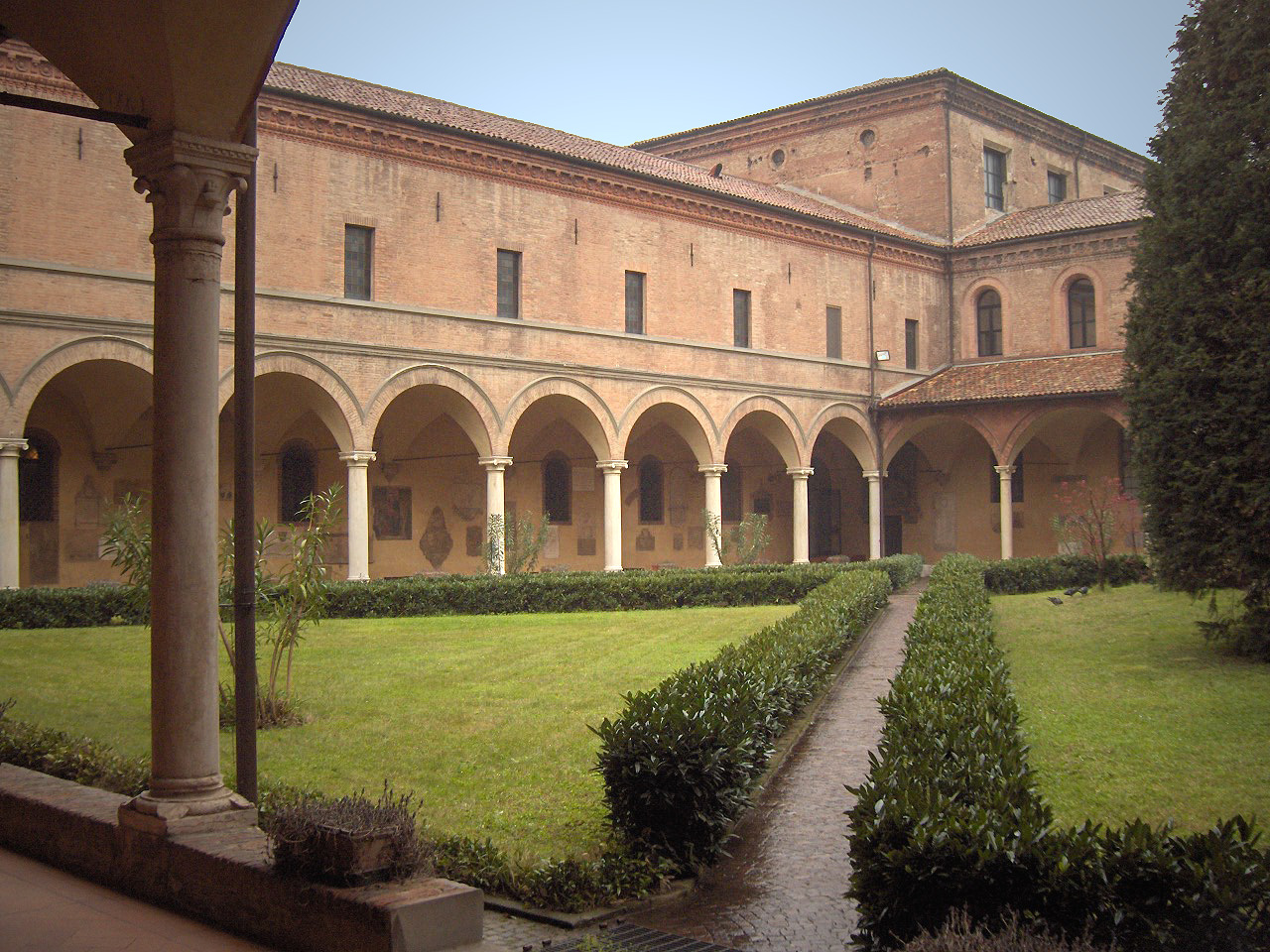
The Basilica of San Domenico in Bologna, photographed in 2006

The servant identified in the rumours was Anna Morisi. After receiving written permission to investigate from the Supreme Sacred Congregation of the Roman and Universal Inquisition (also called the Holy Office), the body of cardinals responsible for overseeing and defending Catholic doctrine, Feletti interrogated her at the Basilica of San Domenico in Bologna. Morisi averred that while she was employed by the Mortaras, their infant son Edgardo had fallen gravely sick while in her care, leading her to fear that he might die. She said that she had performed an emergency baptism herself – sprinkling some water on the boy's head and saying: "I baptise you in the Name of the Father, and of the Son, and of the Holy Ghost" – but had never revealed that to the child's family. Edgardo had since recovered. Feletti had Morisi swear to keep the story quiet and sent a transcript of the meeting to Rome, requesting permission to remove the then six-year-old Edgardo from his family.

It is not known whether Pope Pius IX was involved in any of the early Holy Office discussions over Mortara, or was otherwise aware of Feletti's initial investigation. He was its official head but only occasionally attended its meetings, and was not likely to have been consulted about what the cardinals saw as routine matters. For the Holy Office, situations such as that reported by Feletti presented a profound quandary – on the one hand, the Church officially disapproved of forced conversions, but on the other, it held that the baptismal sacrament was sacrosanct and that if it had been properly administered, the recipient was thereafter a member of the Christian communion. In accordance with the 1747 papal bull Postremo mense, the laws of the Papal States held that it was illegal to remove a child from non-Christian parents for baptism (unless it was dying), but if such a child was indeed baptised the Church was held to bear responsibility to provide a Christian education and remove it from its parents. (Note: Other Catholic nations such as the Austrian Empire had similar laws.)

The cardinals considered Morisi's account and ultimately accepted it as bearing "all the earmarks of the truth without leaving the least doubt about the reality and the validity of the baptism she performed". Feletti was instructed to arrange Edgardo's removal and transport to the House of Catechumens in Rome, where instruction was given to those who were newly converted or in the process of converting to Catholicism. (Note: The Holy Office's final letter of recommendation to Feletti regarding Mortara has not survived – Kertzer suggests that it was burned by Church authorities when the Papal Legations fell in 1859.)

=== Removal ===
A detail of papal carabinieri (military police), led by Marshal Pietro Lucidi and Brigadier Giuseppe Agostini, arrived at the Mortara apartment in Bologna soon after sunset on 23 June 1858. After asking a few questions about the family, Lucidi announced: "Signor Mortara, I am sorry to inform you that you are the victim of a betrayal", and explained that they were under orders from Feletti to remove Edgardo as he had been baptised. Marianna screamed hysterically, ran to Edgardo's bed and shrieked that they would have to kill her before taking him. Lucidi said repeatedly that he was only following Feletti's orders. He reported afterwards that he "would have a thousand times preferred to be exposed to much more serious dangers in performing my duties than to have to witness such a painful scene". (Note: One of the Mortaras' neighbours recalled Lucidi saying in the apartment that he "would have rather been ordered to arrest a hundred criminals than to take that boy away".)

Lucidi offered to let Edgardo's father accompany them to the inquisitor to discuss the matter with him. Momolo refused, but Lucidi allowed him to send his eldest son, Riccardo, to summon relatives and neighbours. Marianna's uncle Angelo Padovani, a prominent member of Bologna's Jewish community, concluded that their only hope was to appeal to Feletti. The inquisitor received Padovani and Marianna's brother-in-law Angelo Moscato at San Domenico soon after 23:00. Feletti said that he, like Lucidi, was merely following orders. He declined to reveal why it was thought that Edgardo had been baptised, saying that it was confidential. When the men begged him to at least give the family one last day with Edgardo, the inquisitor acquiesced, on the condition that no attempt was made to spirit the child away. He gave Padovani a note to that effect to pass on to the marshal. Lucidi left as ordered, leaving two men to stay in the Mortaras' bedroom and watch over Edgardo.

The Mortaras spent the morning of 24 June attempting to have Feletti's order overruled by either the city's cardinal legate, Giuseppe Milesi Pironi Ferretti, or the Archbishop of Bologna, Michele Viale-Prelà, but they found that neither was in the city. Around noon, the Mortaras decided to take steps to make the removal as painless as possible. Edgardo's siblings were taken to visit relatives, while Marianna reluctantly agreed to spend the evening with the wife of Giuseppe Vitta, a Jewish family friend. Around 17:00, Momolo visited San Domenico to make one last plea to Feletti. The inquisitor repeated all he had said to Padovani and Moscato the previous night and told Momolo not to worry, because Edgardo would be well cared for, under the protection of the Pope himself. He warned that it would benefit no-one to make a scene when the carabinieri returned that evening.

Momolo went home to find the apartment empty, apart from Vitta, Marianna's brother (also called Angelo Padovani), the two policemen and Edgardo himself. At about 20:00, the carabinieri arrived in two carriages – one for Lucidi and his men, and another in which Agostini would drive Edgardo. Lucidi entered the apartment and removed Edgardo from his father's arms, prompting the two policemen who had guarded him to shed tears. Momolo followed the police down the stairs to the street, then fainted. Edgardo was passed to Agostini and driven away.

== Appeal ==
=== Initial appeal; Morisi confronted ===
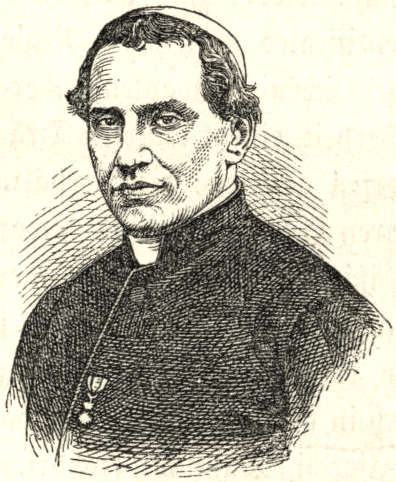
Giacomo Antonelli, the Pope's head of government as Cardinal Secretary of State

With no way of knowing where the boy had been taken (Momolo only found out in early July), the Mortaras, supported by the Jewish communities in Bologna, Rome and elsewhere in Italy, initially focused on drafting appeals and trying to rally support from Jews abroad. The greatly expanded public voice wielded by Jews in western European countries, as a result of recent moves towards increasing the freedom of the press, coupled with Jewish political emancipation in the Kingdom of Sardinia, Britain, France and the United States, caused Mortara's removal to gain press attention far beyond anything previously given to such incidents. The papal government was initially disposed to simply ignore Momolo's appeals, but reconsidered after newspapers began reporting on the case. The pontifical state's many detractors seized on the episode as an example of papal tyranny.

Anxious to protect the Papal States' precarious diplomatic position, the Cardinal Secretary of State, Giacomo Antonelli, liaised with Rome's Jewish community to arrange a meeting with Momolo Mortara, and received him politely in early August 1858. Antonelli promised that the matter would be referred to the Pope, and granted Momolo's request that he be allowed to visit Edgardo regularly in the House of Catechumens. Kertzer cites Antonelli's concession of repeated visits, as opposed to the usual single meeting, as the first sign that the Mortara case would take on a special significance.

The attempts of the Mortaras and their allies to identify who was supposed to have baptised Edgardo quickly bore fruit. After their current servant, Anna Facchini, adamantly denied any involvement, they assessed former employees and soon earmarked Morisi as a possible candidate. In late July 1858, the Mortara home was visited by Ginerva Scagliarini, a friend of Morisi's who had once worked for Marianna's brother-in-law Cesare De Angelis. Marianna's brother, Angelo Padovani, tested Scagliarini by saying falsely that he had heard it was Morisi who had baptised Edgardo. The ruse worked: Scagliarini said that she had been told the same thing by Morisi's sister Monica.

The younger Angelo Padovani went with De Angelis to confront Morisi in San Giovanni in Persiceto. Padovani recalled finding her in tears. After the visitors assured her that they meant no harm, Morisi recounted what she had told Feletti. She said that a grocer named Cesare Lepori had suggested the baptism when she mentioned Edgardo's sickness, and had shown her how to perform it. She had not mentioned it to anyone, she went on, until soon after Edgardo's brother Aristide died at the age of one in 1857. When a neighbour's servant, called Regina, proposed that Morisi should have baptised Aristide, that she had done so to Edgardo "slipped out of my mouth". According to Padovani, Morisi described crying during her interrogation by the inquisitor, and expressed guilt over Edgardo's removal: "figuring that it was all my fault, I was very unhappy, and still am." Morisi agreed to have that formally recorded, but was gone when Padovani and De Angelis returned after three hours with a notary and two witnesses. (Note: During the visitors' absence, Morisi's sisters and the parish priest told her to say nothing more. She vacated her apartment and hid elsewhere in the town.) After searching for her in vain, they went back to Bologna with only their hearsay account of her story, which Padovani thought genuine: "Her words, and her demeanour, and her tears before she could launch into her story, persuaded me that what she told me was all true."

=== Two narratives ===
From mid-August to mid-September 1858, Edgardo was visited by his father several times, under the supervision of the rector of the Catechumens, Enrico Sarra. The wildly divergent accounts of what happened during those encounters grew into two rival narratives of the entire case. Momolo's version of events, favoured by the Jewish community and other backers, was that a family had been destroyed by the papal government's religious fanaticism, that helpless Edgardo had spent the journey to Rome crying for his parents, and that the boy wanted nothing more than to return home. (Note: Momolo also reported that according to the rector, Edgardo had said his fear when the police came for him was because he thought they wanted to behead him.) The narrative favoured by the Church and its supporters, and propagated in the Catholic press throughout Europe, was one of divinely ordained, soul-stirring redemption, and a child endowed with spiritual strength far beyond his years. Whereas the neophyte Edgardo had faced a life of error, followed by eternal damnation, he now stood to share in Christian salvation, and was distraught that his parents would not convert with him.

The central theme in almost all renditions of the narrative favouring the Mortara family was that of Marianna Mortara's health. From July 1858 onwards, it was reported across Europe that, as a result of her grief, Edgardo's mother had practically, if not actually, gone insane, and might even die. The powerful image of the heartbroken mother was stressed heavily in the family's appeals both to the public and to Edgardo himself. Momolo and the secretary of Rome's Jewish community, Sabatino Scazzocchio, told Edgardo that his mother's life was at risk if he did not come back soon. When Marianna wrote to her son in August, Scazzocchio refused to deliver the letter on the grounds that, being relatively calm and reassuring in tone, it might work against the impression they were trying to give him that she was no longer herself and that only his return could save her. In January 1859, one correspondent reported: "The father shows a great deal of courage, but the mother is having a hard time carrying on. ... If the Holy Father had seen this woman as I saw her, he would not have the courage to keep her son another moment." (Note: He added: "The widespread rumour that she has gone mad is not true. She still has all of her wits.")

There were many different versions of the Catholic story, but all followed the same basic structure. All had Edgardo quickly and fervently embracing Christianity and trying to learn as much as possible about it. Most described a dramatic scene of Edgardo wondering at a painting of the Virgin Mary in sorrow, either in Rome or during the journey from Bologna. Agostini, the policeman who had escorted him to Rome, reported that the boy had at first stubbornly refused to enter a church with him for Mass, but displayed an apparently miraculous transformation when he did. (Note: Agostini attested that as soon as six-year-old Edgardo entered the church, "thanks to the Heavenly wonders, there was an instantaneous change. Getting down on his knees, he took part quietly in the Divine Sacrifice", and listened intently as the policeman explained what was happening. Agostini taught Edgardo first to make the sign of the cross, then to say the Hail Mary. The boy thereafter "forgot his parents", Agostini reported, and insisted on visiting the church of every town they entered until they reached Rome.)

A common theme was that Edgardo had become a kind of prodigy. According to an eyewitness account published in the Catholic L'armonia della religione colla civiltà, he had learned the catechism perfectly within a few days, "blesse[d] the servant who baptised him", and declared that he wanted to convert all Jews to Christianity. The most influential pro-Church article on Mortara was an account published in the Jesuit periodical La Civiltà Cattolica in November 1858, and subsequently reprinted or quoted in Catholic papers across Europe. That story had the child begging the rector of the Catechumens not to send him back but to let him grow up in a Christian home, and initiated what became a central plank of the pro-Church narrative – that Edgardo had a new family, namely the Catholic Church itself. The article quoted Edgardo as saying: "I am baptised; I am baptised and my father is the Pope."

According to Kertzer, the proponents of the pro-Church narrative did not seem to realise that to many those accounts sounded "too good to be true" and "absurd". Kertzer comments: "If Edgardo in fact told his father that he did not want to return with him, that he now regarded the Pope as his true father and wanted to devote his life to converting the Jews, this message seems not to have registered with Momolo." Liberals, Protestants and Jews across the continent ridiculed the reports in the Catholic press. A booklet, published in Brussels in 1859, outlined the two contrasting narratives, then concluded: "Between the miracle of a six-year-old apostle who wants to convert the Jews and the cry of a child who keeps asking for his mother and his little sisters, we don't hesitate for a moment." Mortara's parents furiously denounced the Catholic accounts as lies, but some of their supporters were less certain about where Edgardo's loyalties then lay. They included Scazzocchio, who had attended some of the disputed meetings at the Catechumens.

=== Lepori's denial; Morisi discredited ===
Momolo returned to Bologna in late September 1858, after his two brothers-in-law wrote to him that if he stayed in Rome any longer the family might be ruined. He left Scazzocchio to represent the family's cause in Rome. (Note: By then, rumours were flying among the Italian Jewish communities to the effect that Edgardo had received a second, more regular baptism in the Catechumens, but Kertzer suggests that was probably not true.) Momolo shifted his priority to attempting to undermine Morisi's credibility, either by disproving aspects of her story or by showing her to be untrustworthy. He also resolved to confront Cesare Lepori, the grocer who Morisi said had both suggested the baptism and shown her how to perform it. Based on Morisi's story, Lepori had already been identified by many observers as being ultimately to blame for the affair. When Momolo visited his shop in early October, Lepori vehemently denied that he had ever spoken to Morisi about Edgardo or any baptism, and said that he was prepared to testify to that effect before any legal authority. He claimed that he did not himself know how to administer baptism so, had such a conversation occurred, it could hardly have gone as Morisi described.

Carlo Maggi, a Catholic acquaintance of Momolo's who was also a retired judge, sent a report of Lepori's refutation to Scazzocchio, who asked Antonelli to pass it on to the Pope. A covering letter, attached to Maggi's statement, described it as proof that Morisi's story was false. Scazzocchio also forwarded an affidavit from the Mortara family doctor, Pasquale Saragoni, who acknowledged that Edgardo had fallen sick when he was about a year old, but stated that he had never been in danger of dying and that, in any case, Morisi had herself been bedridden at the time she was supposed to have baptised the boy. A further report sent from Bologna in October 1858, comprising the statements of eight women and one man, all Catholics, corroborated the doctor's claims about the sicknesses of Edgardo and Morisi respectively, and alleged that the former maid was given to theft and sexual impropriety. Four women, including the servant Anna Facchini and the woman who had employed Morisi after she left the Mortaras, Elena Pignatti, claimed that Morisi had regularly flirted with Austrian officers and invited them into her employers' homes for sex.

=== Alatri, then back to Rome ===
Momolo set out for Rome again on 11 October 1858, bringing Marianna with him in the hope that her presence might make a stronger impression on the Church and Edgardo. Anxious about the possible consequences of a dramatic reunification between mother and son, the rector, Enrico Sarra, took Edgardo from Rome to Alatri, his own home town about 100 kilometres (62 mi) away. The Mortaras tracked them to a church in Alatri where, from the door, Momolo saw a priest saying Mass, with Edgardo by his side, assisting him. Momolo waited outside and, afterwards, persuaded the rector to let him see his son. Before any meeting could take place, the Mortaras were arrested on the orders of the Mayor of Alatri, himself following a request from the town's bishop, and despatched back to Rome. Antonelli was not impressed, considering it to be an undignified line of action that would give obvious ammunition to the Church's detractors, and ordered Sarra to bring Edgardo back to the capital to meet his parents.

Edgardo returned to the Catechumens on 22 October, and was visited by his parents often over the next month. As with Momolo's first round of visits, two different versions emerged of what happened. According to Edgardo's parents, the boy was obviously intimidated by the clergymen around him and threw himself into his mother's arms when he first saw her. Marianna later said: "He had lost weight and had turned pale; his eyes were filled with terror ... I told him that he was born a Jew like us and like us he must always remain one, and he replied: "Sì, mia cara mamma, I will never forget to say the Shema every day." (Note: The Shema – "Hear, O Israel: the Lord is our God, the Lord is One" – is one of the most important prayers in Judaism, and is supposed to be said by Jews every morning and evening.) One report in the Jewish press described the priests telling Edgardo's parents that God had chosen their son to be "the apostle of Christianity to his family, dedicated to converting his parents and his siblings", and that they could have him back if they also became Christians. The clerics and nuns then knelt and prayed for the conversion of the Mortara household, prompting Edgardo's parents to leave in terror.

The pro-Church accounts, by contrast, described a boy very much resolved to stay where he was, and horrified by his mother's exhortations to return to the Judaism of his ancestors. In that narrative, the main reason for the Mortaras' grief was not that their son had been taken, but that he now stood to grow up in the Christian faith. According to La Civiltà Cattolica, Marianna flew into a rage on seeing a medallion hanging from Edgardo's neck bearing the image of the Virgin Mary, and ripped it off. One article went so far as to claim the Jewish mother had done that with the words: "I'd rather see you dead than a Christian!" Some of the Church's critics had charged that by keeping Edgardo, it was violating the commandment that a child should honour his father and mother – La Civiltà Cattolica countered that Edgardo still loved his family despite their religious differences and indeed, after being taught by the priests to read and write, had chosen to write his first letter to his mother, signing it "your most affectionate little son". After meeting Edgardo in Rome, Louis Veuillot, the ultramontane editor of the newspaper L'Univers and one of the Pope's staunchest defenders, reported that the boy had told him "that he loves his father and his mother, and that he will go to live with them when he is older ... so that he can speak to them of Saint Peter, of God, and of the most Holy Mary".

== Outrage ==
=== International scandal and political machinations ===
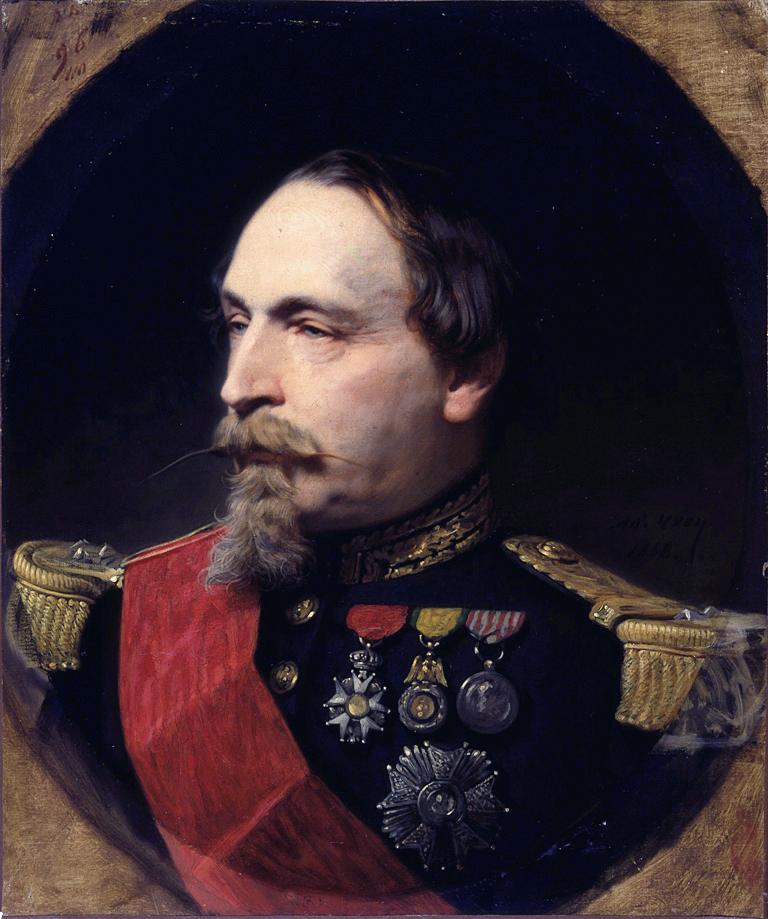
Napoleon III of France was among the international figures enraged by the Papal States' actions over Mortara.

Having made no progress in Rome, Momolo and Marianna Mortara returned to Bologna in early December 1858, and moved to Turin, in Piedmont, soon afterwards. The case, an anti-Catholic "publicist's dream", to quote Kertzer, had become a massive controversy in both Europe and the United States by then, with voices across the social spectrum clamouring for the Pope to return Edgardo to his parents. Mortara became a cause célèbre, not only for Jews but for Protestant Christians as well, particularly in the United States, where anti-Catholic sentiment abounded. The New York Times published more than 20 articles on the case in December 1858 alone. In Britain, The Spectator presented the Mortara case as evidence that the Papal States had "the worst government in the world – the most insolvent and the most arrogant, the cruelest and the meanest". The Catholic press both in Italy and abroad steadfastly defended the Pope's actions. The pro-Church articles often took on an overtly antisemitic character, charging, for example, that was hardly a surprise that coverage in Britain, France or Germany was critical, "since currently the newspapers of Europe are in good part in the hands of the Jews". Scazzocchio suggested that the press storm attacking the Church was actually counter-productive for the Mortara family's cause, because it angered the Pope and steeled his resolve not to compromise.

Regardless of whether Pope Pius IX had been personally involved in the decision to remove Mortara from his parents (whether he had been or not was debated extensively in the press), what is certain is that he was greatly surprised by the international furore that erupted over the matter. He adopted the position, based on Postremo mense, that to return the baptised child to his non-Christian family would be incompatible with Church doctrine. As foreign governments and the various branches of the Rothschild family one by one condemned his actions, Pius IX stood firm on what he saw as a matter of principle. Those angered included Napoleon III of France, who found the situation particularly vexing because the pontifical government owed its very existence to the French garrison in Rome. Napoleon III had indifferently supported the Pope's temporal rule because it enjoyed widespread support among French Catholics. Mortara's abduction was widely condemned in the French press and weakened support for the papacy. According to the historian Roger Aubert, it was the final straw that changed French policy.

In February 1859, Napoleon III concluded a secret pact with the Kingdom of Sardinia pledging French military support for a campaign to drive the Austrians out and unify Italy. Most of the pontifical domain would be absorbed along with the Two Sicilies and other minor states. (Note: That followed an earlier agreement along similar lines between the Emperor and King Victor Emmanuel II's Prime Minister, Count Cavour, on 21 July 1858. The case was brought to Napoleon III's attention early by a cousin based in Bologna, Marquis Gioacchino Pepoli, before representatives of France's Jewish community sent him a written appeal in August 1858.)

At that time, it was an annual custom for the Pope to receive a delegation from Rome's Jewish community shortly after the New Year. The meeting, on 2 February 1859, quickly descended into a heated argument, with Pope Pius berating the Jewish visitors for "stirring up a storm all over Europe about this Mortara case". When the delegation denied that the Jews of Rome had had any hand in the anti-clerical articles, the Pope dismissed Scazzocchio as inexperienced and foolish, then shouted: "The newspapers can write all they want. I couldn't care less what the world thinks!" The Pope then calmed down somewhat: "So strong is the pity I have for you, that I pardon you, indeed, I must pardon you." One of the delegates proposed that the Church should not give so much credence to Morisi's testimony, given her spurious morals, but the Pope countered that, regardless of her character, so far as he could see the servant had no reason to invent such a story and, in any case, Momolo Mortara should not have employed a Catholic in the first place.

Pope Pius IX's determination to keep Edgardo developed into a strong paternal attachment. According to Edgardo's memoirs, the pontiff regularly spent time with him and played with him. The Pope would amuse the child by hiding him under his cloak and calling out: "Where's the boy?" At one of their meetings, Pope Pius told Edgardo: "My son, you have cost me dearly, and I have suffered a great deal because of you." He then said to others present: "Both the powerful and the powerless tried to steal this boy from me, and accused me of being barbarous and pitiless. They cried for his parents, but they failed to recognise that I, too, am his father."

=== Montefiore's petition; fall of Bologna ===
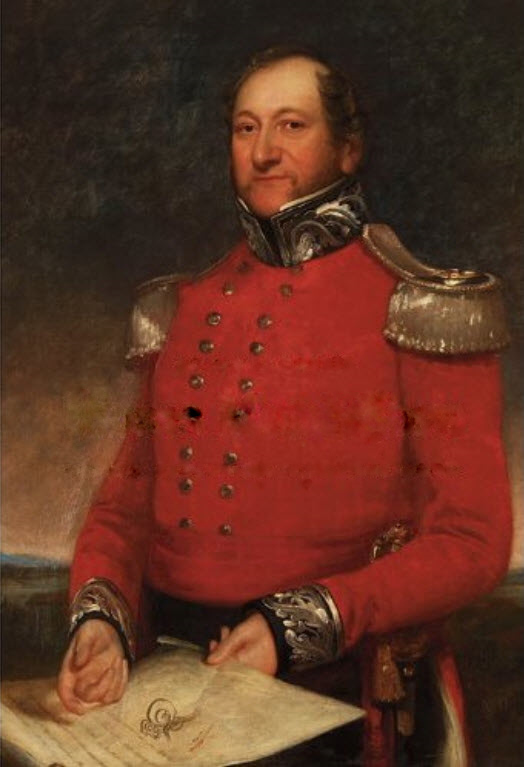
Sir Moses Montefiore, president of the Board of Deputies of British Jews, attempted to intercede on behalf of the Mortara family.

The Italian Jewish appeals came to the attention of Sir Moses Montefiore, the president of the Board of Deputies of British Jews, whose willingness to travel great distances to help his co-religionists, as he had over the Damascus blood libel of 1840, for example, was already well known. From August to December 1858, he headed a special British committee on Mortara that relayed reports from Piedmont to British newspapers and Catholic clergymen, and noted the support expressed by British Protestants, particularly the Evangelical Alliance led by Sir Culling Eardley. A strong advocate of conversion of the Jews, Eardley believed that the affair would slow down that process. After unsuccessfully attempting to have the British government lodge an official protest with the Vatican, Montefiore resolved to personally travel to Rome to present a petition to the Pope calling for Edgardo to be returned to his parents. He arrived in Rome on 5 April 1859. (Note: Europe had lost much of its interest in Mortara by that point but, across the Atlantic, it continued to command great attention. The New York Herald reported in March that American interest had grown to "colossal dimensions".)

Montefiore failed to gain an audience with the Pope, and was received by Cardinal Antonelli, only on 28 April. Montefiore gave him the Board of Deputies' petition to pass on to the Pope, and said that he would wait in the city a week for the pontiff's reply. Two days later, news reached Rome that fighting had broken out between Austrian and Piedmontese troops in the north. The War of 1859 had begun. While most foreign dignitaries fled Rome as quickly as possible, Montefiore waited in vain for the Pope's response, finally leaving on 10 May. On his return to Britain, more than 2,000 leading citizens, including 79 mayors and provosts, 27 peers, 22 Anglican bishops and archbishops and 36 members of parliament, signed a protest message calling the Pope's conduct a "dishonour to Christianity", "repulsive to the instincts of humanity". Meanwhile, the Church quietly had Edgardo confirmed as a Catholic in a private chapel on 13 May 1859. By that time, Edgardo was no longer in the Catechumens but at San Pietro in Vincoli, a basilica elsewhere in Rome, where Pope Pius had personally decided the boy would be educated.

As the war turned against the Austrians, the garrison in Bologna left early in the morning on 12 June 1859. By the end of the same day, the papal colours flying in the squares had been replaced with the Italian green, white and red, the cardinal legate had left the city, and a group styling itself Bologna's provisional government had proclaimed its desire to join the Kingdom of Sardinia. Bologna was promptly incorporated as part of the province of Romagna. The Archbishop Michele Viale-Prelà attempted to persuade the citizenry not to cooperate with the new civil authorities but had little success. One of the first official acts of the new order was to introduce freedom of religion and make all citizens equal before the law. In November 1859, the governor Luigi Carlo Farini issued a proclamation abolishing the inquisition.

== Retribution ==
=== Feletti arrested ===
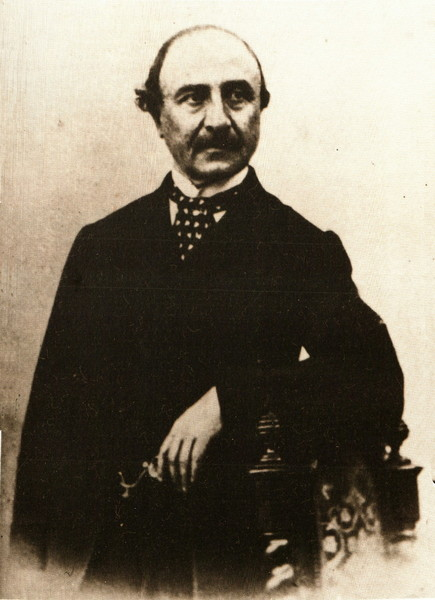
Luigi Carlo Farini, governor of Romagna after the papal authorities in Bologna fell in 1859

Momolo Mortara spent late 1859 and January 1860 in Paris and London, trying to rally support. While he was away, his father Simon, who lived about 30 kilometres (19 mi) west of Bologna in Reggio Emilia, successfully asked the new authorities in Romagna to launch an inquiry into the Mortara case. On 31 December 1859, Farini ordered his justice minister to pursue the "authors of the kidnapping". Filippo Curletti, the new director-general of police for Romagna, was put in charge of the investigation. After two officers identified the erstwhile inquisitor, Feletti, as having given the order to remove Edgardo, Curletti and a detachment of police went to San Domenico on 2 January 1860 and arrested him at about 02:30.

The police inspectors questioned Feletti, but each time they asked about anything to do with Mortara or his removal, the friar said that a sacred oath precluded his discussing affairs of the Holy Office. When Curletti ordered him to hand over all files relating to the Mortara case, Feletti said that they had been burned. When asked when or how, he repeated that on Holy Office matters he could say nothing. Pressed further, Feletti said: "As far as the activities that I carried out as Inquisitor of the Holy Office of Bologna, I am obliged to explain myself to one forum only, to the Supreme Sacred Congregation in Rome, whose Prefect is His Holiness Pope Pius IX, and to no-one else." The police searched the convent for documents relating to the Mortara case, finding nothing, but the inquisitor was escorted to prison. The news that Feletti had been arrested caused the press storm concerning Mortara, which had died down somewhat, to flare up again across Europe.

=== Investigation ===
Feletti's trial was the first major criminal case in Bologna under the new authorities. On 18 January 1860, the magistrate, Francesco Carboni, announced that Feletti and Lieutenant-Colonel Luigi De Dominicis would be prosecuted, but not Lucidi or Agostini. (Note: The reasoning was that the latter two had merely followed orders from a direct superior, while De Dominicis would have had some responsibility to ascertain the order's legality.) When Carboni interviewed Feletti in prison on 23 January, the friar said that, in seizing Edgardo from his family, he had only carried out instructions from the Holy Office, "which never promulgates any decree without the consent of the Roman Pontiff". Feletti then recounted a version of the Church narrative of the case, stating that Edgardo had "always remained firm in his desire to remain a Christian" and was now studying successfully in Rome. In conclusion, he predicted that Edgardo would one day be the "support and pride" of the Mortara family. (Note: Among other things, Feletti told Carboni that the Pope had arranged free passage for Edgardo's parents so they could come to Rome to visit him. Carboni checked that with the Bologna stagecoach office, which reported no evidence of any such request from Rome during the second half of 1858.)

On 6 February, Momolo Mortara gave an account of the case that contradicted the inquisitor's at almost every turn. In Rome, he said, Edgardo had been "frightened, and intimidated by the rector's presence, [but] he openly declared his desire to return home with us". Carboni then travelled to San Giovanni in Persiceto to interrogate Morisi, who gave her age as 23 rather than the actual 26. (Note: The illiterate Morisi was never clear on her exact age. As Kertzer comments, that would normally have made little difference, but the massive press attention turned her exact age into a topic of debate. She herself said that she had baptised Edgardo when she was only 14, a claim that supporters of the Mortara family seized upon as another reason to discount the baptism. Her birth certificate was dated 28 November 1833, meaning that she would actually have been about 19 years old at the time of the incident.) Morisi said that Edgardo had fallen sick in the winter of 1851–52, when he was about four months old. She recounted having seen the Mortaras sitting sadly by Edgardo's crib and "reading from a book in Hebrew that the Jews read when one of them is about to die". She repeated her account of giving Edgardo an emergency baptism at the instigation of the grocer Lepori and later telling the story to a neighbour's servant called Regina, adding that she had also told her sisters about the baptism. (Note: When Carboni posited that if Lepori had spoken to her about baptising a Jewish child he would surely have asked afterwards if she had gone through with it, Morisi replied that they had never discussed it again.)

As before, Lepori denied any role in the affair whatsoever, asserting that he could not even remember Morisi. The "Regina" in Morisi's story was identified as Regina Bussolari but, though Morisi averred to have told her the whole story, Bussolari professed to know nothing of the case. She said that she had spoken with Morisi only "once or twice, when she was going up to the storage room to get something", and never about anything to do with the Mortaras' children. (Note: Like Morisi, Bussolari came from San Giovanni in Persiceto. Carboni looked into her background and found that she was described as spending a lot of time at church, which he thought might indicate an upright character who could be trusted, but the police reports soon turned up the revelation that Bussolari was "a procuress ... her house is frequented by all types of people, indeed even priests, for relations with women.")

Elena Pignatti, who had employed Morisi after she left the Mortaras in 1857, and whose words about Morisi's misconduct had formed part of the Mortaras' appeal to the Pope, testified that

seven or eight years ago ... a son of the Mortaras, whose name I don't know, became sick, and it was said that he was going to die. Around then, one morning ... I ran into Morisi. Among the other things we talked about, she – without mentioning the child's illness – asked me "I've heard that if you baptise a Jewish child who's about to die he goes to Heaven and gets indulgence; isn't that right?" I don't remember what I told her, but when the Mortara boy was kidnapped by order of the Dominican Father, I was sure that he must have been the one who was sick.

Pignatti said that she had herself seen Edgardo during his illness, and Marianna sitting by the crib: "Since his mother was crying, and despaired for his life, I thought he was dying, also because of his appearance: his eyes were closed, and he was hardly moving." She added that during the three months when Morisi worked for her in late 1857, the servant had been summoned to San Domenico four or five times, and had said that the inquisitor had promised her a dowry.

Bussolari's denial that she had discussed any baptism with Morisi raised the question of who could have reported the rumours to the inquisitor in the first place. On 6 March, Carboni interviewed Morisi again and pointed out the inconsistencies between her story and the testimony of the Mortara family doctor, the Mortaras themselves, and both Lepori and Bussolari. She replied: "It's the Gospel truth". Carboni put it to Morisi that she might have invented the whole story out of spite against the Mortara family in the hope that the Church might reward her. (Note: Momolo had testified that Morisi had left his employment after "some words with my wife", but that "there weren't any bad feelings of a sort that would reasonably lead to any fear of a vendetta".) When Carboni asked Morisi if she had been to San Domenico apart from for her interrogation, she stated that she had been there on two other occasions to try to secure a dowry from Father Feletti. Carboni suggested that Morisi must have herself prompted the interrogation by recounting Edgardo's baptism during one of those visits, but Morisi insisted that the interrogation had been first and the other two visits later. (Note: In any case, she said, she had not ultimately received a dowry, and had married without one.)

After one last interview with Feletti, who again said almost nothing, citing a sacred oath, Carboni informed him that so far as he could see, there was no evidence to support his version of events. Feletti replied: "I commiserate with the Mortara parents for their painful separation from their son, but I hope that the prayers of the innocent soul succeed in having God reunite them all in the Christian religion ... As for my punishment, not only do I place myself in the Lord's hands, but I would argue that any government would recognise the legitimacy of my action." The next day, Feletti and De Dominicis, the latter of whom had fled to the rump Papal States, were formally charged with the "violent separation of the boy Edgardo Mortara from his own Jewish family".

=== Feletti tried and acquitted ===
Feletti faced a court trial under the code of laws in effect in Bologna at the time of Edgardo's removal. Carboni proposed that even under the pontifical laws, the seizure was illegal. He reported that he had seen no evidence to support the friar's claim that he had acted following instructions from Rome, and that there was substantial evidence casting doubt on Morisi's account but, so far as he could see, Feletti had done nothing to verify what she had said before ordering the child removed. After Feletti refused to appoint a defence counsel when prompted, saying he was putting his defence in the hands of God and the Virgin Mary, the experienced Bologna lawyer, Francesco Jussi, was appointed by the state to defend him.

The hearing on 16 April 1860, before a panel of six judges, was attended by neither the Mortara family nor Feletti, the former because they were in Turin and learned of the trial date only two days beforehand, and the latter because he refused to recognise the right of the new authorities to put him on trial. With the evidence gathered by Curletti and Carboni already in hand, the prosecution had no witnesses to call. The prosecutor, Radamisto Valentini, a lawyer fighting his first major case, declared that Feletti had ordered the removal alone and on his own initiative, and then turned his focus to Carboni's second point about how the authorities in Rome could have possibly concluded that Morisi's story was genuine. Valentini went over Morisi's account in detail, arguing that even if things had happened as she said, the baptism had not been administered properly and was therefore invalid. He then highlighted the inconsistencies between her testimony and the other accounts, condemned Morisi as a silly girl "corrupted by the foul breath and touch of foreign soldiers ... [who] rolled over without shame with them", and finally charged that Feletti had ordered the removal himself out of megalomania and "an inquisitor's hatred of Judaism".

Jussi found himself in the unusual position of attempting to defend a client who refused to defend himself. With no evidence at his disposal to support Feletti's testimony, he was forced to rely almost entirely on his own oratory. Jussi noted some aspects of the sequence of events that he said suggested that orders had indeed come from Rome. For example, Feletti had sent Edgardo straight off to the capital without seeing him, and the Holy Office and the Pope were far better placed to adjudge the validity of the baptism than a secular court. He quoted at length from Angelo Padovani's account of his meeting with Anna Morisi in July 1858, then cast doubt on the grocer Lepori's claim that he did not even know how to baptise a child, producing a police report in which Lepori was described as a close friend of a Jesuit priest. Jussi proposed that Lepori and Bussolari might both be lying to protect themselves, and that Morisi's sexual impropriety did not necessarily mean her story was false. He concluded that since Feletti had been inquisitor at the time, he had merely done what that office required him to do, and no crime had been committed. Following a swift deliberation, the judging panel, headed by Calcedonio Ferrari, ruled that Feletti should be released as he had acted under instructions from the government of the time.

The interval between the priest's arrest and his trial, coupled with the swift progress being made towards Italian unification, meant that the Mortara case had lost much of its prominence, so there was little protest against the decision. The Jewish press expressed disappointment – an editorial in the Italian Jewish paper L'Educatore Israelita suggested that it had perhaps been unwise to target Feletti rather than someone more senior. In France, Archives Israélites took a similar line, positing: "what good does it do to strike at the arm when it is the head that in this case conceived, carried out, and sanctioned the attack?" (Note: Feletti's staunch refusal to recognise the court endeared him considerably to his Dominican superiors and the Pope. After the trial he was made prior of a convent in Rome, where he remained until his death at the age of 84, in 1881.)

=== Plans to recapture Edgardo ===
The Mortaras were not surprised by the verdict in Feletti's trial. Momolo hoped that his son might be a major topic of discussion at an international conference on the future of Italy, but was disappointed when no such summit materialised. His cause, and a visit to Paris, partly motivated the formation in May 1860 of the Alliance Israélite Universelle, a Paris-based organisation dedicated to the advancement of Jewish civil rights across the world. As the Italian nationalist armies advanced through the peninsula, the fall of Rome seemed imminent. In September 1860, the Alliance Israélite Universelle wrote to Momolo offering him financial and logistical support if he wished to reclaim his son by force, as "getting your child back is the cause of all Israel". A separate plan was formulated by Carl Blumenthal, an English Jew serving in Giuseppe Garibaldi's nationalist volunteer corps: Blumenthal and three others would dress up as clergymen, seize Edgardo, and spirit him away. Garibaldi approved the plan in 1860, but it was apparently called off after one of the conspirators died.

== Conclusion ==
=== Italian unification; Edgardo flees ===
The Kingdom of Italy (azure) and the Papal States (purple) in 1870.

The Pope remained steadfastly determined not to give Edgardo up, declaring: "What I have done for this boy, I had the right and the duty to do. If it happened again, I would do the same thing." When the delegation from Rome's Jewish community attended their annual meeting at the Vatican in January 1861, they were surprised to find the nine year-old Edgardo at the Pope's side. The new Kingdom of Italy was proclaimed two months later with Victor Emmanuel II as king. A reduced incarnation of the Papal States, comprising Rome, its immediate environs, and Lazio, endured outside the new kingdom because of Napoleon III's reluctance to offend his Catholic subjects by withdrawing the French garrison. He pulled these troops out in 1864 following the September Convention and transport to the Catechumens of another Jewish child, nine-year-old Giuseppe Coen from the Roman Ghetto. The removal of the French garrison brought the Roman Question to the fore in the Italian parliament. The statesman Marco Minghetti dismissed a proposed compromise whereby Rome would become part of the kingdom with the Pope retaining some special powers, saying: "We cannot go to guard the Mortara boy for the Pope." The French garrison returned in 1867, following an unsuccessful attempt by Garibaldi to capture the city.

In early 1865, at the age of 13, Edgardo became a novice in the Canons Regular of the Lateran, adding the Pope's name to his own to become Pio Edgardo Mortara. (Note: In religious settings he was sometimes also known as Pio Maria Mortara.) He wrote repeatedly to his family, he recalled, "dealing with religion and doing what I could to convince them of the truth of the Catholic faith", but received no reply until May 1867. His parents, who were now living in Florence, wrote that they still loved him dearly, but saw nothing of their son in the letters they had received. In July 1870, just before Edgardo turned 19, the French garrison in Rome was withdrawn for good after the Franco-Prussian War broke out. Italian troops captured the city on 20 September 1870.

Momolo Mortara followed the Royal Italian Army into Rome, hoping to finally reclaim his son. According to some accounts, he was preceded by his son Riccardo, Edgardo's elder brother, who had entered the kingdom's service as an infantry officer. Riccardo Mortara fought his way to San Pietro in Vincoli and found his brother's convent room. Edgardo covered his eyes, raised his hand in front of him and shouted: "Get back, Satan!" When Riccardo said that he was his brother, Edgardo replied: "Before you get any closer to me, take off that assassin's uniform." (Note: This account is given in Gemma Volli's 1960 work on the Mortara case, Il caso Mortara nel primo centario. Kertzer writes that "as a piece of drama, it seems almost too good to be true ... unfortunately, I could find no good evidence to support it, although we do know that Riccardo Mortara had become a career army officer.") Whatever the truth, what is certain is that Edgardo reacted to the capture of Rome with intense panic. He later wrote: "After the Piedmontese troops entered Rome ... they used their force to seize the neophyte Coen from the Collegio degli Scolopi, [then] turned toward San Pietro in Vincoli to try to kidnap me as well." The Roman chief of police asked Edgardo to return to his family to appease public opinion, but he refused. He subsequently met the Italian commander, General Alfonso Ferrero La Marmora, who told him that as he was 19 years old he could do as he wished. Edgardo was smuggled out of Rome by train along with a priest on 22 October 1870, late at night and in lay clothes. He made his way north and escaped to Austria-Hungary. (Note: Giuseppe Coen, who was by now 16 years old, was restored to his family against his will after a court decided that as he was not yet an adult his father still held legal rights over him. Coen returned to Rome as soon as he could and became a priest.)

=== Father Mortara ===
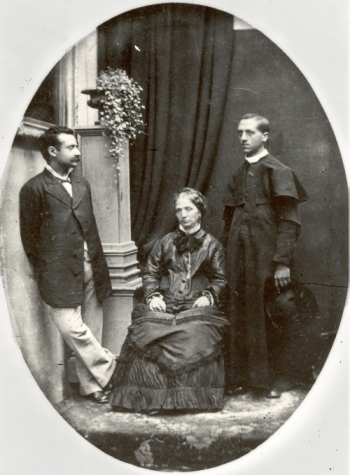
Father Pio Edgardo Mortara (right) with his mother Marianna, c. 1878–1890

Edgardo found shelter in a convent of the Canons Regular in Austria, where he lived under an assumed name. In 1872, he moved to a monastery at Poitiers in France, where Pope Pius regularly corresponded with the bishop about the young man. After a year, Pio Edgardo Mortara was ordained as a priest. That required special dispensation because, aged 21, he was technically too young. He received a personal letter from the Pope to mark the occasion, along with a lifetime trust fund of 7,000 lire to support him.

Father Mortara spent most of the rest of his life outside Italy, travelling throughout Europe and preaching. It was said that he could give sermons in six languages, including Basque, and read three more, including Hebrew. "As a preacher he was in great demand," Kertzer writes,

not least because of the inspirational way he was able to weave the remarkable story of his own childhood into his sermons. As he recounted it, his saga was the stuff of faith and hope: A story of how God chose a simple, illiterate servant girl to invest a small child with the miraculous powers of divine grace, and in doing so rescued him from his Jewish family – good people but, as Jews, on a God-forsaken path.

Momolo Mortara died in 1871, shortly after spending seven months in prison during his trial over the death of a servant girl who had fallen from the window of his apartment. The Florentine court of appeal found him guilty of murdering her, but he was acquitted by the court of assizes. Pope Pius IX died in 1878. The same year, Marianna travelled to Perpignan in south-western France, where she had heard Edgardo was preaching, and enjoyed an emotional reunion with her son, who was pleased to see her, but disappointed when she refused his pleas to convert to Catholicism. Edgardo thereafter attempted to re-establish connections with his family, but not all of his relatives were as receptive to him as his mother.

Following Marianna's death in 1890, it was reported in French newspapers that she had finally, on her deathbed, and with Edgardo beside her, become a Christian. Edgardo refuted that: "I have always ardently desired that my mother embrace the Catholic faith," he wrote in a letter to Le Temps, "and I tried many times to get her to do so. However, that never happened". A year later, Father Pio Edgardo Mortara returned to Italy, for the first time in two decades, to preach in Modena. A sister and some of his brothers went to hear his sermon, and for the rest of his life Edgardo called on his relatives whenever he was in Italy. During a 1919 sojourn in Rome he visited the House of Catechumens he had entered 61 years before. By that time, he had settled at the abbey of the Canons Regular at Bouhay in Liège, Belgium. Bouhay had a sanctuary to the Virgin of Lourdes, to which Father Mortara felt a special connection, the Lourdes apparitions of 1858 having occurred in the same year as his own conversion to Christianity. Father Pio Edgardo Mortara resided at Bouhay for the rest of his life and died there on 11 March 1940, at the age of 88.

== Appraisal and legacy ==
The Mortara case is given little attention in most Risorgimento histories, if it is mentioned at all. The first book-length scholarly work was Rabbi Bertram Korn's The American Reaction to the Mortara Case: 1858–1859 (1957), which was devoted entirely to public opinion in the United States and, according to Kertzer, often incorrect about details of the case. The main historical reference until the 1990s was a series of articles written by the Italian scholar Gemma Volli and published around the centenary of the controversy in 1958–60. When David Kertzer began studying the case, he was surprised to find that many of his Italian colleagues were not familiar with it, while specialists in Jewish studies across the world invariably were. Mortara had, as Kertzer put it, "[fallen] from the mainstream of Italian history into the ghetto of Jewish history". Kertzer explored many sources not previously studied and eventually published The Kidnapping of Edgardo Mortara (1997), which has become the standard reference work for the affair.

The Mortara case was, in the view of Timothy Verhoeven, the greatest controversy to surround the Catholic Church in the mid-19th century, because it "more than any other single issue ... exposed the divide between supporters and opponents of the Vatican". Abigail Green writes that "this clash between liberal and Catholic worldviews at a moment of critical international tension ... gave the Mortara affair global significance – and rendered it a transformative episode in the Jewish world as well". Mortara himself suggested in 1893 that his abduction had been, for a time, "more famous than that of the Sabine Women".

In the months before Pius IX's beatification by the Catholic Church in 2000, Jewish commentators and others in the international media raised the largely forgotten Mortara episode while analysing the Pope's life and legacy. According to Dov Levitan, the basic facts of the Mortara case are far from unique, but it is of particular importance nevertheless, because of its effect on public opinion in Italy, Britain and France, and as an example of "the great sense of Jewish solidarity that emerged in the latter half of the 19th century [as] Jews rose to the cause of their brethren in various parts of the world". The Alliance Israélite Universelle, the formation of which had been partly motivated by the Mortara case, grew into one of the most prominent Jewish organisations in the world, and endures into the 21st century.

According to Michael Goldfarb, the Mortara controversy provided "an embarrassing example of just how out of touch with modern times the Church was", and demonstrated that "Pope Pius IX was incapable of bringing the Church into the modern era". Kertzer takes a similar view: "The refusal to return Edgardo contributed to the growing sense that the Pope's role as temporal ruler, with his own police force, was an anachronism that could no longer be maintained." Kertzer suggests that the affair may have motivated the French to change their stance on Italian unification in 1859–1861.

In the twenty-first century, some supporters of Catholic integralism, such as Romanus Cessario, have defended Pius IX's actions during the affair, arguing that civil liberties should be subordinate to the Catholic religion. Some conservative Catholic commentators such as Vittorio Messori have also defended the Church's actions, though not from an integralist point of view.

== In popular media ==
The case is the subject of Francesco Cilluffo's two-act opera Il caso Mortara, which premiered in New York in 2010. The publication, by Vittorio Messori in 2005, of the Italian language version (adulterated) of Mortara's unpublished Spanish memoirs, available in English since 2017 under the title Kidnapped by the Vatican? The Unpublished Memoirs of Edgardo Mortara, reignited the debate.

In 2023, Marco Bellocchio released Kidnapped: The Abduction of Edgardo Mortara, a film he also wrote and directed.

== See also ==
- Josef di Michele Coen
- Finaly Affair
- List of kidnappings
- Pope Pius IX and Judaism
