= Armand Lévy =

Armand Lévy may refer to:

- Armand Lévy (mineralogist) (1795–1841), French mathematician and mineralogist
- Armand Lévy (activist) (1827–1891), French lawyer and journalist
