= Tadeusz Gorecki =

Lithuanian-born Polish painter

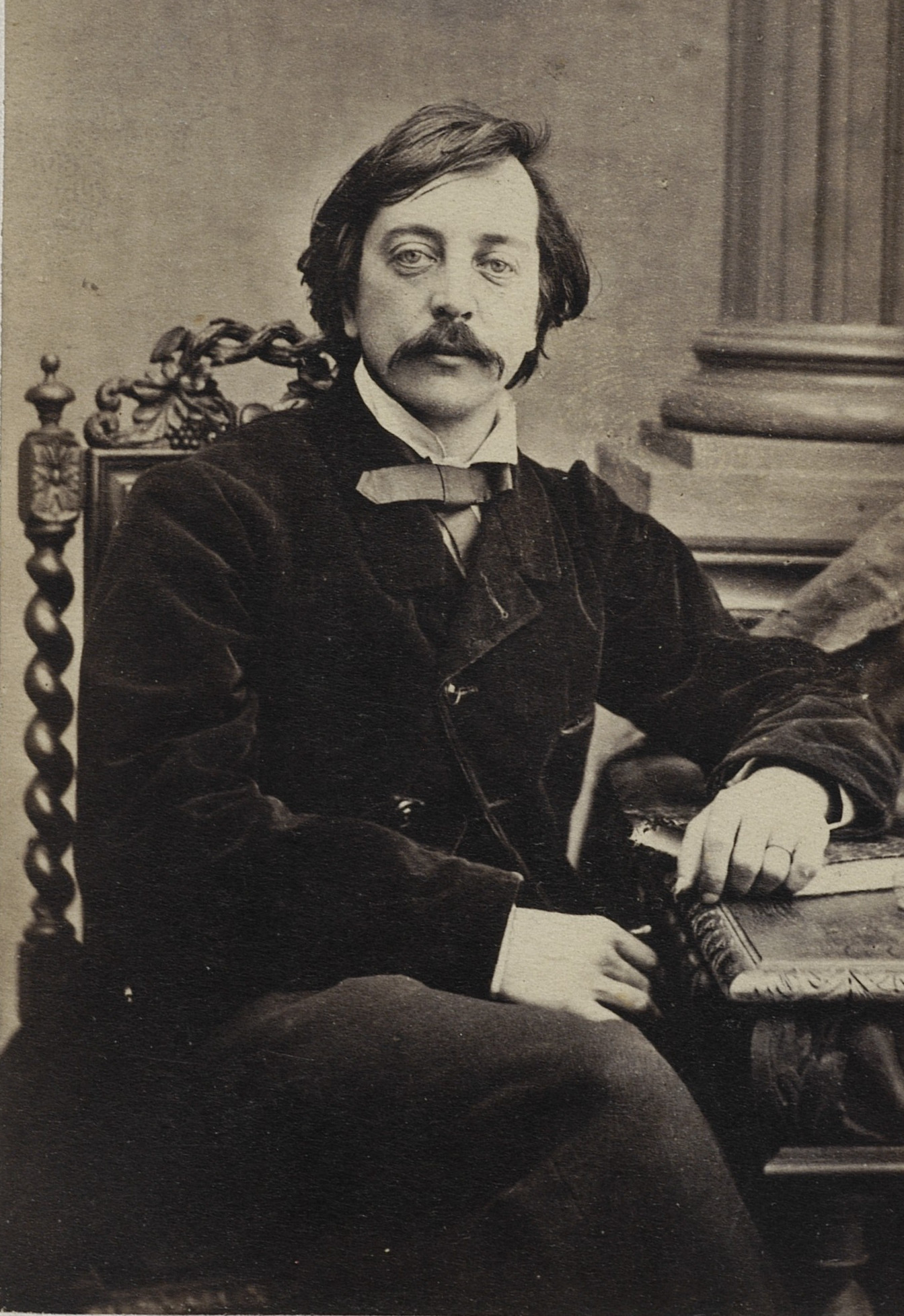
- Gorecki in 1867
- Born: 5 June 1825; Dusinėnai, Vilensky Uyezd, Vilna Governorate, Russian Empire
- Died: 31 January 1868 (aged 42); Vichy, France
- Resting place: Montparnasse Cemetery
- Education: Karl Bryullov
- Known for: Painting
- Spouse: Maria Mickiewicz (m. 1857)
- Awards: Big Gold Medal of the Imperial Academy of Arts (1849)
- Elected: Member Academy of Arts (1854)

Tadeusz Gorecki (Lithuanian: Tadas Goreckis; 5 June 1825 – 31 January 1868) was a Polish-Lithuanian genre and portrait painter.

== Biography ==
Tadeusz Gorecki was born on 5 June 1825 in the manor of Dusinėnai (or Dusenėtai), near modern-day Vilnius. He came from an aristocratic family. His father was the poet and short story writer, Antoni Gorecki. After participating in the November Uprising, his father had to flee to Paris, leaving the family in Vilnius. Their money and possessions were confiscated by the Russian authorities.

Attracted to art at an early age, he probably received lessons from his cousin, Walenty Wańkowicz. His first formal lessons were with Kanuty Rusiecki. Later, he studied at the Imperial Academy of Fine Arts with Karl Bryullov. From 1843 to 1847, he was Bryullov's assistant for painting frescoes at Saint Isaac's Cathedral.

In 1850, he applied for and was awarded the title of "Portrait Artist" for his painting of Peter Clodt von Jürgensburg. Later that year, he began an extensive trip, visiting Warsaw, Berlin, Paris and Madrid, where he spent some time copying works at the Museo del Prado. In 1854, he was named an "Academician" and, the following year, made an extended visit to Italy.

In November 1857, he went to Paris to marry the writer Maria Mickiewiczówna, daughter of the poet, Adam Mickiewicz. The marriage was opposed by her family, as she had recently refused a marriage proposal by her father's friend, Armand Lévy. An argument of an unknown nature almost led to a duel with her brother, Władysław. Tragedy was averted, but his relationship with her family continued to be troubled. Their situation was made more bearable by the fact that, during these years, he got to know his father for the first time. Gorecki made a series of illustrations for Adam Mickiewicz's poem Pan Tadeusz.

In 1862, he was awarded the Order of the Lion and the Sun for teaching Western-style art to four Persian students, but had to refuse the award under pressure from the Russian government. Four years later, he paid a last visit to Vilnius. He died after a long illness at the age of forty-three and was buried next to his father at Montparnasse Cemetery. His wife outlived him by fifty-four years. A notable collection of his works is at the Arts Museum of Belarus.

== Selected paintings ==
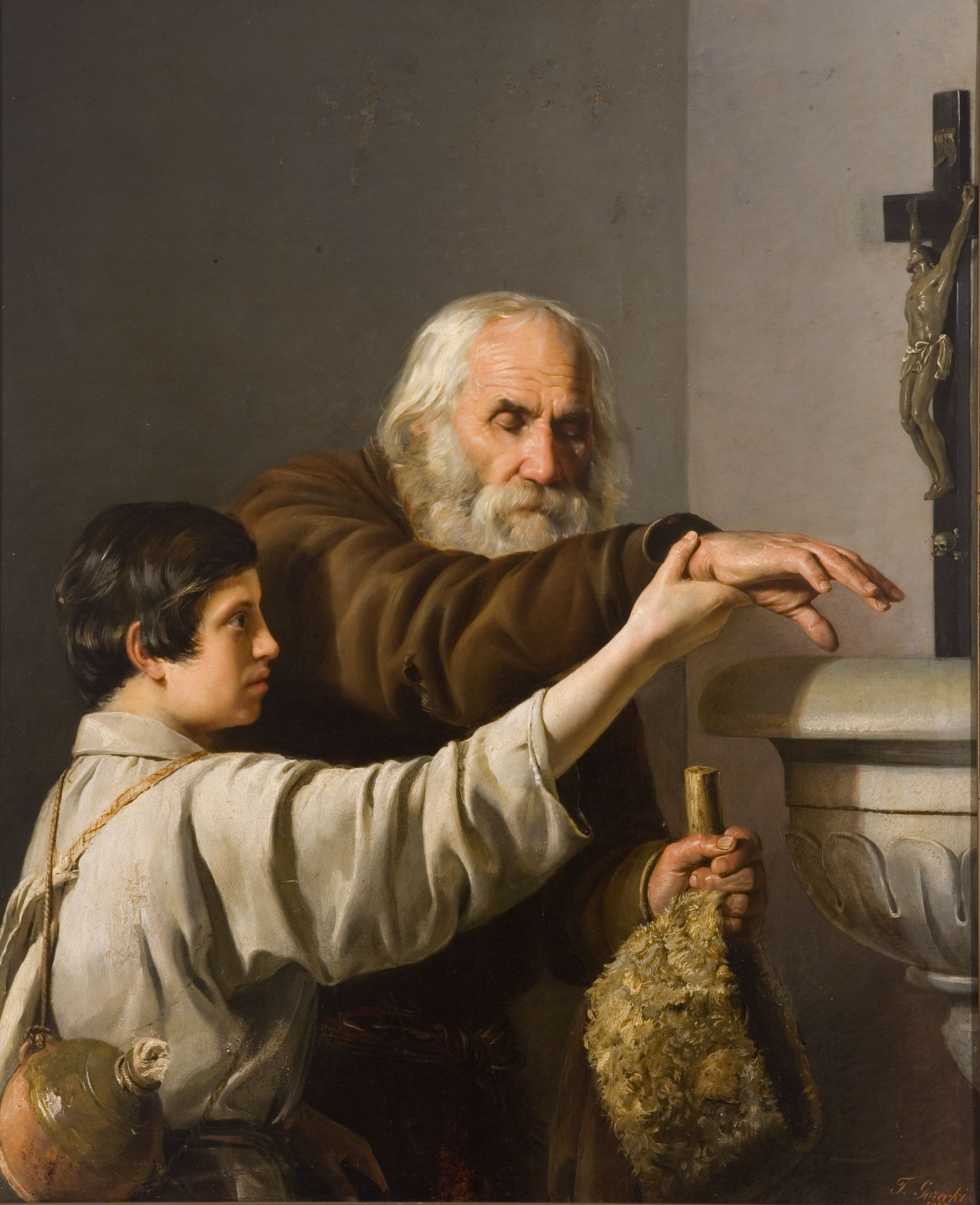
Blind Beggar with a Boy, 1843; Picture Gallery, Vilnius

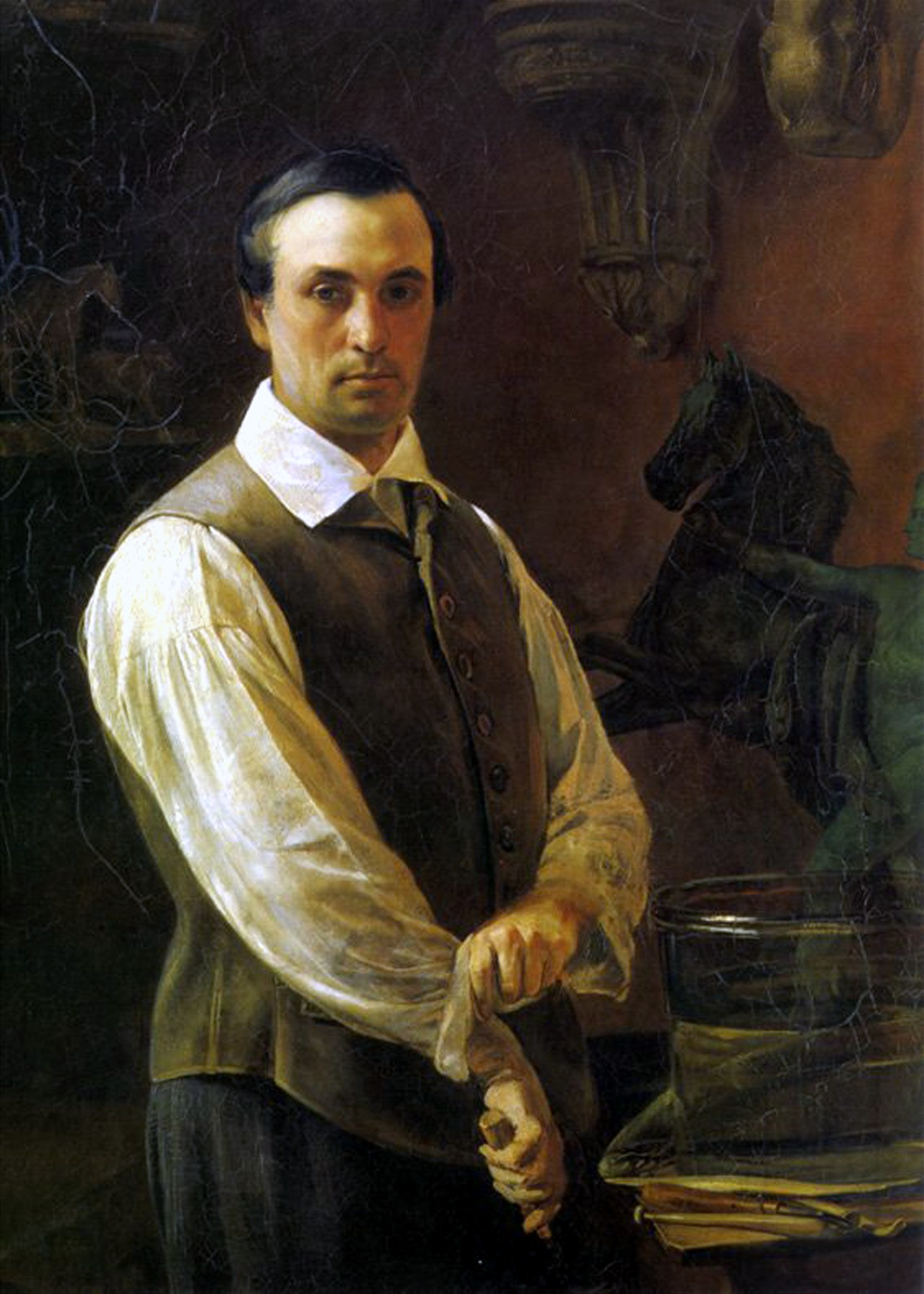
Baron Peter Clodt von Jurgensburg, 1850; Tretyakov Gallery, Moscow, bought by Pavel Tretyakov from Aleksandr Stanyukovich, the sitter's son-in-law, in 1872

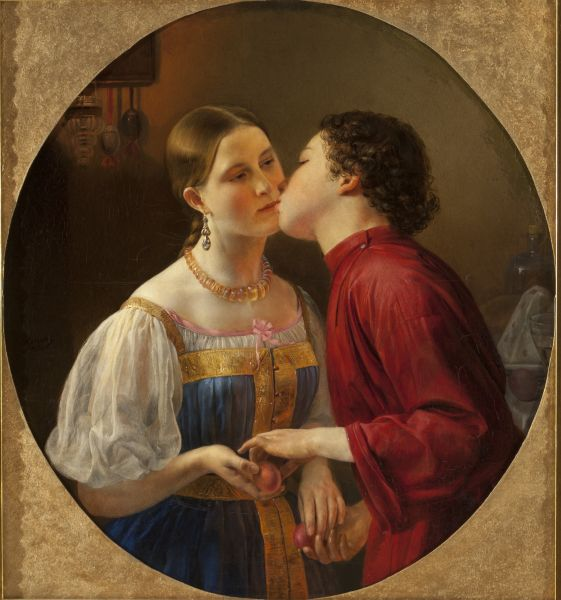
Easter Kisses, 1850; Russian Museum, St. Petersburg

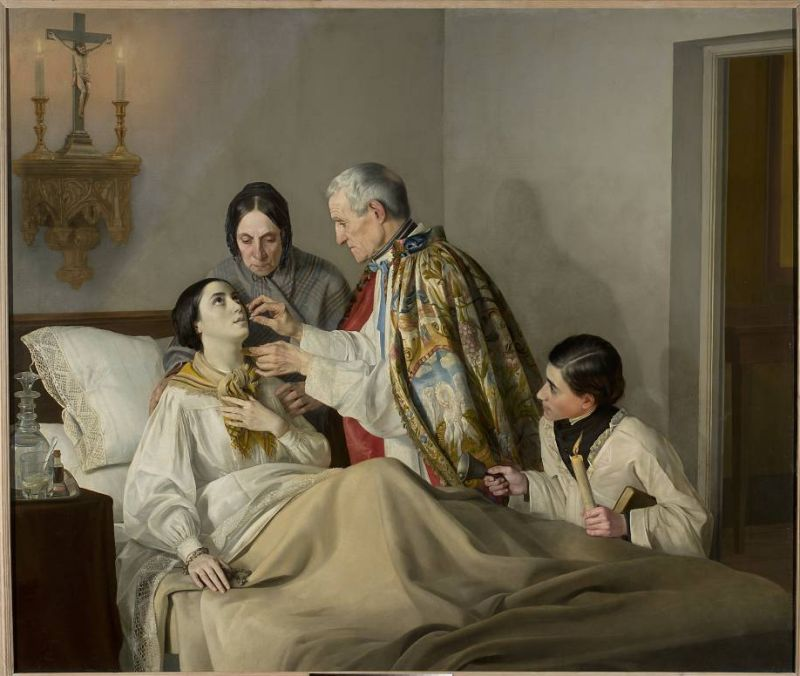
Viaticum, 1852; Museum Narodowe, Warsaw

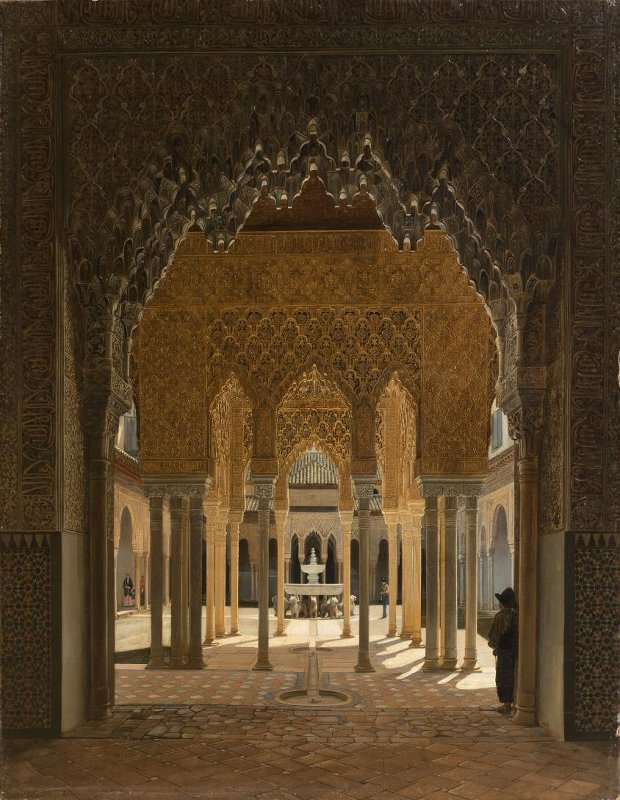
View of the Court of the Lions in Alhambra, 1853; Pavlovsk Museum Reserve

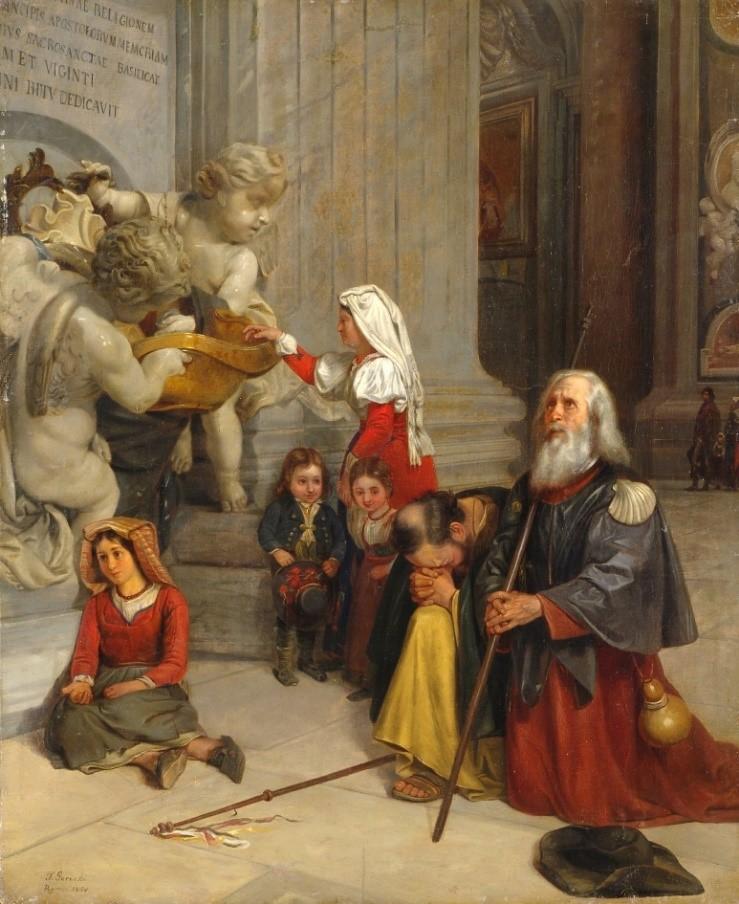
Pilgrims at the Entrance to St. Peter's Basilica, 1854; Art Museum of Belarus, Minsk

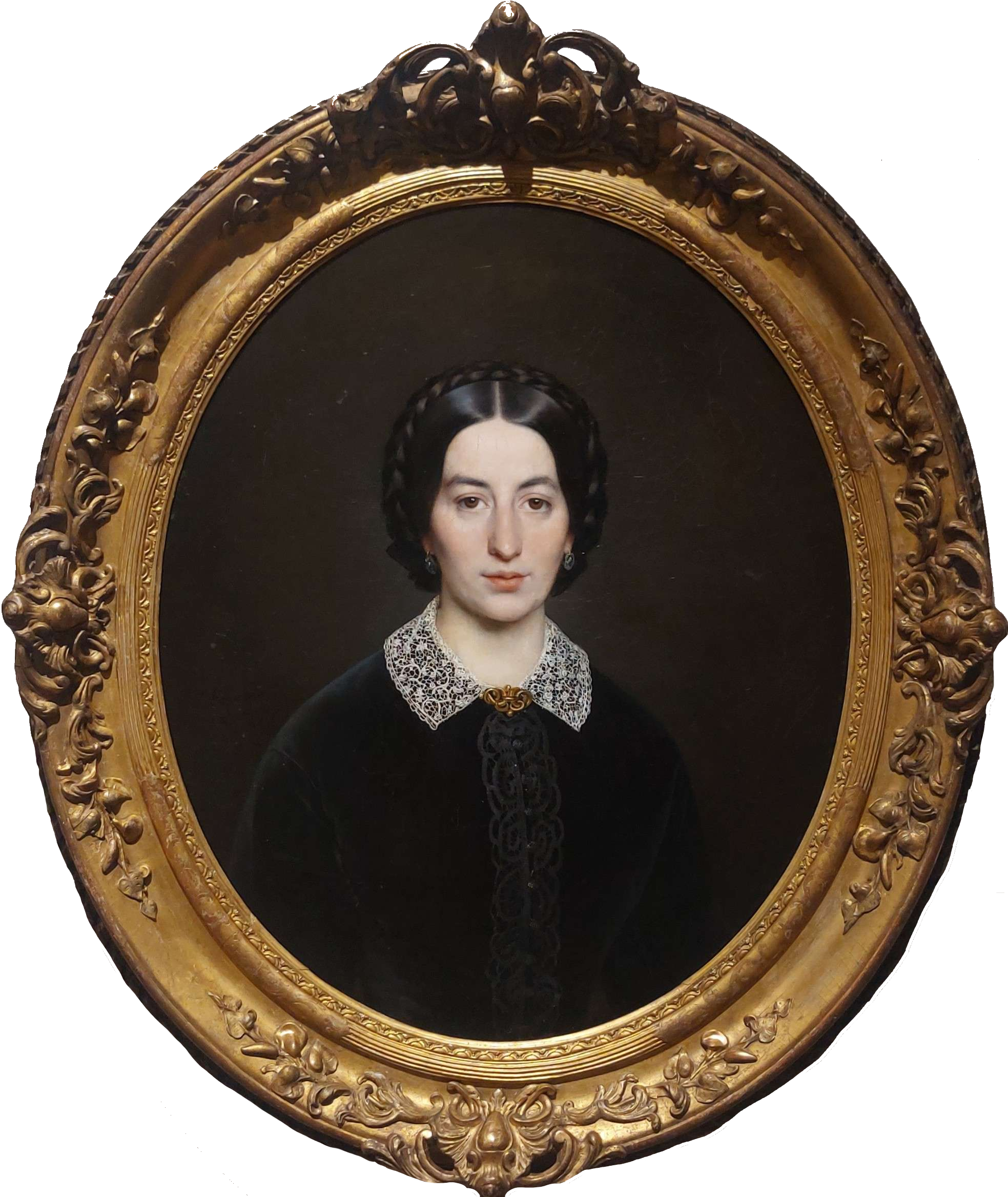
Portrait of an Unknown Woman, 1855; Čiurlionis Museum, Kaunas

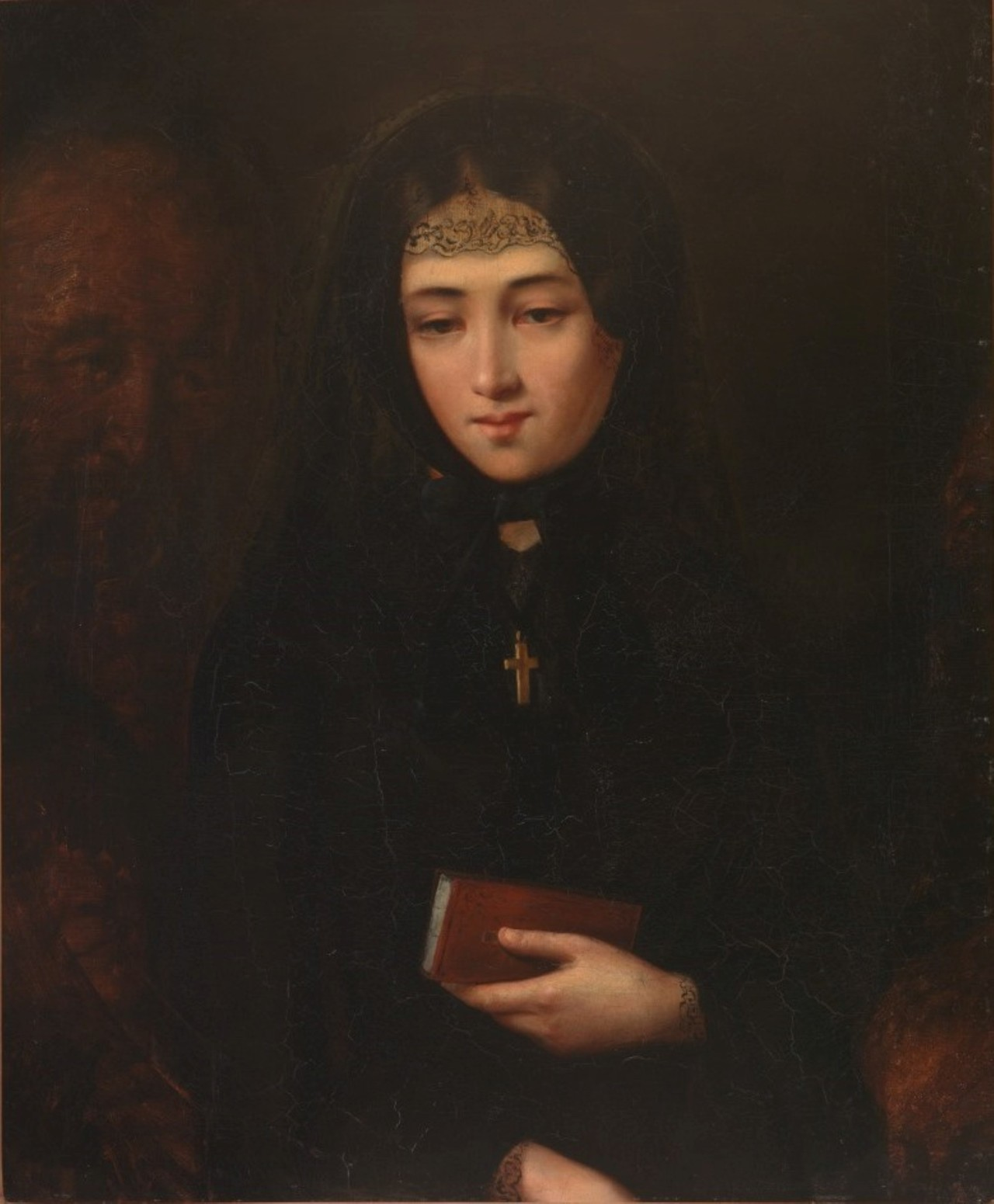
Humility, a remade portrayal of Maria Mickiewicz, the painter's spouse, c. 1855–1857; Picture Gallery, Vilnius
