= Henry Denifle =

Austrian paleographer and historian

Henry Denifle, in German Heinrich Seuse Denifle (baptized Joseph; January 16, 1844 in Imst, Tyrol – June 10, 1905 in Munich), was an Austrian paleographer and historian.

His father, who was the village schoolmaster and church organist, had him educated in the episcopal seminary of Brixen. On his reception, at Graz, 22 Sept., 1861, into the Dominican Order, he took the name of Heinrich. His studies of Aristotle and St. Thomas were begun in Graz and continued in Rome and Marseilles.

After his return to Graz, Denifle taught philosophy and theology for ten years (1870-1880), and during this period also he was one of the best preachers in Austria. A course of apologetic sermons delivered in Graz cathedral Die katholische Kirche und das Ziel der Menschheit was printed in 1872. Denifle, who had loved music from his childhood and composed pieces of music at fifteen, also published in 1872, as his first literary essay, an article on the Gregorian Chant: "Schonheit und Würde des Chorals". In 1873, he published a series of articles entitled "Tetzel und Luther," which would become the subject of one of his greatest works. From then on, though he preached occasionally, the biography of Denifle is the description of his literary achievements. His literary career may be divided into four periods characterized respectively by work on theology and mysticism, medieval universities, the Hundred Years War between France and England with its consequences to the Catholic Church, and Luther and Lutheranism.

According to Romanus Cessario, Denifle's "best known and 'lasting' work" is his Chartularium Universitatis Parisiensis, a study of the official papers associated with the University of Paris.

He died in Munich in 1905 while traveling to Cambridge to receive an honorary doctorate.
