= Ascarelli =

Ascarelli is a surname. Notable people with the surname include:

- Devorà Ascarelli (fl. 16th-century), Italian Jewish poet
- Moses Vita Ascarelli (1826–1889), Italian physician, rabbi, and writer

== See also ==
- Stadio Giorgio Ascarelli, stadium in Naples, Italy
