= Hamagid =

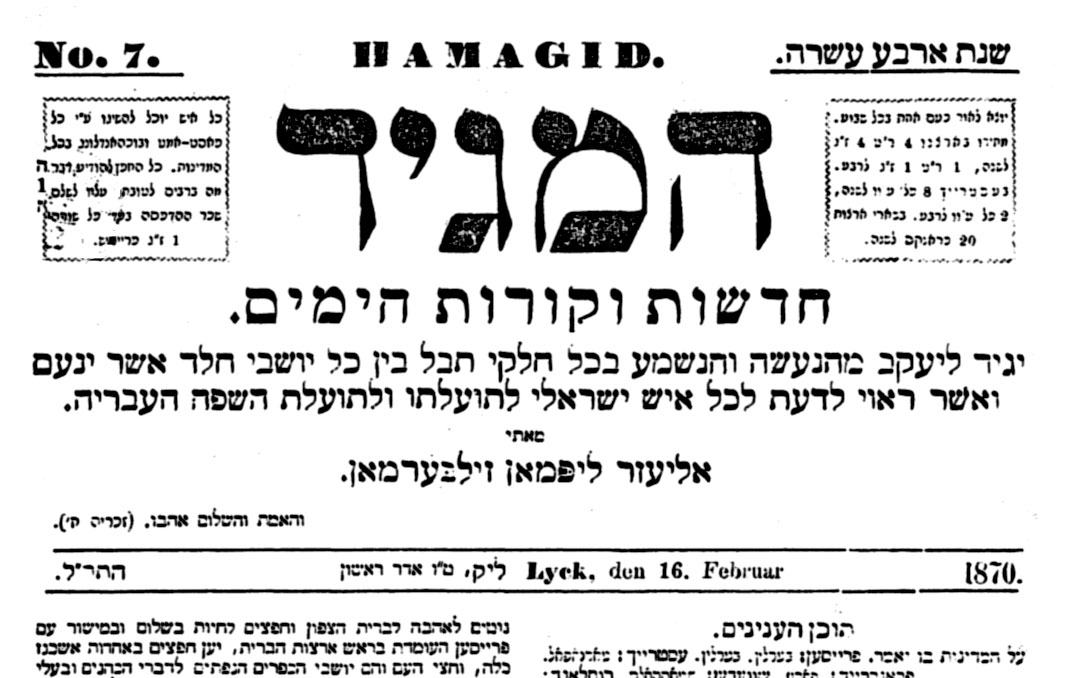
- Type: Weekly newspaper
- Founded: 1856
- Political alignment: Zionism
- Language: Hebrew
- Ceased publication: 1903
- Headquarters: Lyck, East Prussia
- Country: East Prussia
- Free online archives: Online, searchable Hamagid editions from the Historical Jewish Press

Hamagid (Hebrew: הַמַּגִּיד; lit. 'the Declarer'), also known after 1893 as Hamagid LeIsrael (הַמַּגִּיד לְיִשְׂרָאֵל), was the first Hebrew language weekly newspaper. It featured mostly current events, feature articles, a section on Judaic studies, and, in its heyday, discussions of social issues. Published between 1856 and 1903, it first appeared in Lyck, East Prussia and targeted Russian Jews, but was soon redistributed all over Europe and the Jewish world. Although it only had a peak circulation of 1,800 copies, it's primarily remembered as beginning the modern day Hebrew language press. It is hard to estimate its true readership, as in its era one copy would pass through many hands.

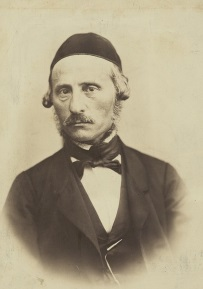
Eliezer Lipman Zilbermann, founding editor of Hamagid

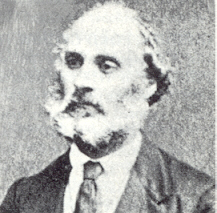
David Gordon, first deputy editor of Hamagid, and editor between 1880 and 1886

Hamagid carried global and Jewish news in Hebrew, either translated, or as original reporting. It was also the first newspaper to publish op-eds in Hebrew.

The founder and first editor of Hamagid was Eliezer Lipman Zilbermann (1819 – 1882). He is credited with bringing the social issue of the agunot to the forefront of reader's minds, and he made the issue one of the most important topics in the paper. A frequent contributor to the weekly was Moses Vita Ascarelli; under the pen name, "Emet le-Ya'akov," he wrote articles on the condition of Italian Jews under Pope Pius IX. From the 1860s, the paper "fervently" supported resettlement of the Land of Israel for a combination of religious and nationalistic reasons, making the paper an early nucleus of the Zionist movement.

David Gordon (1831 – 1886), formerly deputy editor, became editor in 1880, and his son became deputy editor. He held the position of editor until his death in 1886. After the death of his father, Dov Gordon continued as editor until 1890, until Yaacov Shmuel Fux took over, who edited between 1890 and 1903 and whose sole focus was on cultural and political issues, and not social issues as previous editors had focused on, in the footsteps of Zilbermann.

Hamagid moved twice: first to Berlin in 1890, then to Kraków in 1892. After moving to Kraków, its readership declined, partly due to censorship by Russian authorities. It finally closed in 1903. In its twilight years, its de facto editor was Shimʻon Menaḥem Lazar, although Fux kept the title of editor until the end.

Post-1892, Hamagid found itself largely supplanted by other Hebrew language newspapers like Ha-Melitz and Ha-Tsfira.

== See also ==
- Lev Levanda
- Der Beobachter an der Weichsel, the first Jewish newspaper
