= Josef di Michele Coen =

Jewish boy taken forcibly from parents and baptized

Josef di Michele Coen (born 1854; date of death unknown) was one of the Italian Jewish children forcibly taken from his parents and baptized under Pius IX.

The Jewish-language German newspaper Allgemeine Zeitung des Judenthums reported the (otherwise poorly documented) facts during the year 1864 and tried to raise awareness of the case.

== Biography ==
Coen was born in 1854 in a poor Jewish family. In 1864 he was apprenticed to a shoemaker. Sent by his master to deliver a pair of shoes at the house of a priest, the boy was seized and dragged to the Casa dei Neofiti, where he was detained for baptism. The papal authorities refused to surrender him, in spite of the protests of his father and of the Jewish community.

The affair caused a stir throughout Europe, particularly in France, the French ambassador, Count Sartigues, protesting vehemently in the name of his government. To his remonstrance the papal government replied that the child had himself determined to turn Christian, and that it was not the function of the pope to interfere with such a resolution. The pope, in examining into the case, is said to have asked Coen whether he embraced Christianity of his own free will. The boy replied that he preferred a religion which provided him with fine clothes, good food, and plenty of toys, to his poor family and the shoemaker's shop. This reply convinced the pope of the sincerity of the convert's intentions; and accordingly, on St. Michael's Day, Sept. 29, 1864, the baptism of Coen was celebrated in St. Stanislaus Chapel, Cardinal Caggiano officiating, and Count De Maistre being godfather. The neophyte received the name of Stanislaus Maria Michael Joseph Pius Eugenio.

The sufferings of Coen's family, caused by his capture, were excessive. His eighteen-year-old sister died as a result of the excitement; his mother became insane and was taken to relatives in Livorno; and his father had to leave Rome in order to escape the persecution of the government. Another Jew was thrown into prison because he said he had seen Coen at the window of the Casa. Moreover, as a result of the affair, a Christian mechanic caused the forcible baptism of an eight-year-old Jewish boy.

It was only on the fall of the papal government in 1870, and after energetic measures had been taken by the Italian government, that Coen was released and restored to his mother in Livorno, his forcible detention having extended over seven years. His life after that is unknown.

== See also ==
- Edgardo Mortara
- Antisemitism
- History of the Jews in Italy
- Kidnapping
- Forced conversion

== Bibliography ==
- Vogelstein and Rieger, Gesch. der Juden in Rom, ii. 386;
- Allg. Zeit. des Jud. 1864, pp. 533, 580, 631, 699, 730;
- Ha-Maggid, 1870, p. 372.
