= Moses Vita Ascarelli =

Italian physician, rabbi, writer and translator (1826–1889)

- Born: 5 April 1826; Rome, Papal States
- Died: 11 December 1889 (aged 63); Rome, Kingdom of Italy
- Education: University of Rome
- Occupations: Medical doctor, rabbi, writer
- Spouse: Allegra Letizia Pontecorvo (m. 1863)
- Writing career
- Pen name: Emet le-Ya'akov

Moses Vita Ascarelli (Hebrew: משה יחיאל עזכאריאל, Italian: Mosè Vita Ascarelli; 5 April 1826 – 11 December 1889), also known by the pen name Emet le-Ya'akov (Hebrew: אמת ליעקב), was an Italian medical doctor, rabbi, writer, poet, and translator.

== Biography ==
Moses Vita Ascarelli was born to a Jewish family in Rome in 1826. He received his religious education at the Talmud Torah and Rabbinical College in that city, and later studied medicine at the University of Rome. He distinguished himself during the cholera epidemic in 1867, in recognition of which he received a medal from Pope Pius IX. Ascarelli took an active interest in the organization of the Jewish community in Rome; he was one of the founders of the Società di fratellanza, for the dissemination of education and development of the arts among poor Jews, and, together with Pellegrino Pontecorvo, co-founder of the Roman branch of the Alliance Israélite Universelle.

Ascarelli was a frequent contributor under the pseudonym "Emet le-Ya'akov" to the Hebrew journal Ha-Maggid, for which he wrote many poems and articles on the condition of Italian Jews under Pope Pius IX. Ascarelli translated from Hebrew to Italian the work Naḥalah le-Yisrael ('A Heritage unto Israel'), a responsum sent by Chief Rabbi Israel Moses Hazan in connection with a disputed inheritance in the Gallichi family. Ascarelli also published Sefer 'am Polanim ve-gere Polanim, a translation of Adam Mickiewicz's Księgi narodu polskiego i pielgrzymstwa polskiego from Armand Lévy's French translation. He served as rabbi of the Scola Catalana synagogue, and one of his sermons was published under the title Panegirico sull' elezione d'Israele letto nel Tempio israelitico di Roma (Scuola Catalana) il Sciavuot 5640 (17 maggio 1880) per l'iniziazione alla maggiorità religiose del figlio Angelo Raffaele e altri giovanetti della Communione.
