= Pope Pius IX and Judaism =

The relations between Pope Pius IX and Judaism were off to a good start at the beginning of his papacy, but relations later soured after anti-clerical revolutions removed most of the pontiff's temporal power, and he stiffened into intolerance. While Pius rejected charges of antisemitism, the rift created by the Mortara Affair undermined his moral authority in the eyes of some during the rest of his pontificate.

== Status in the Papal States ==
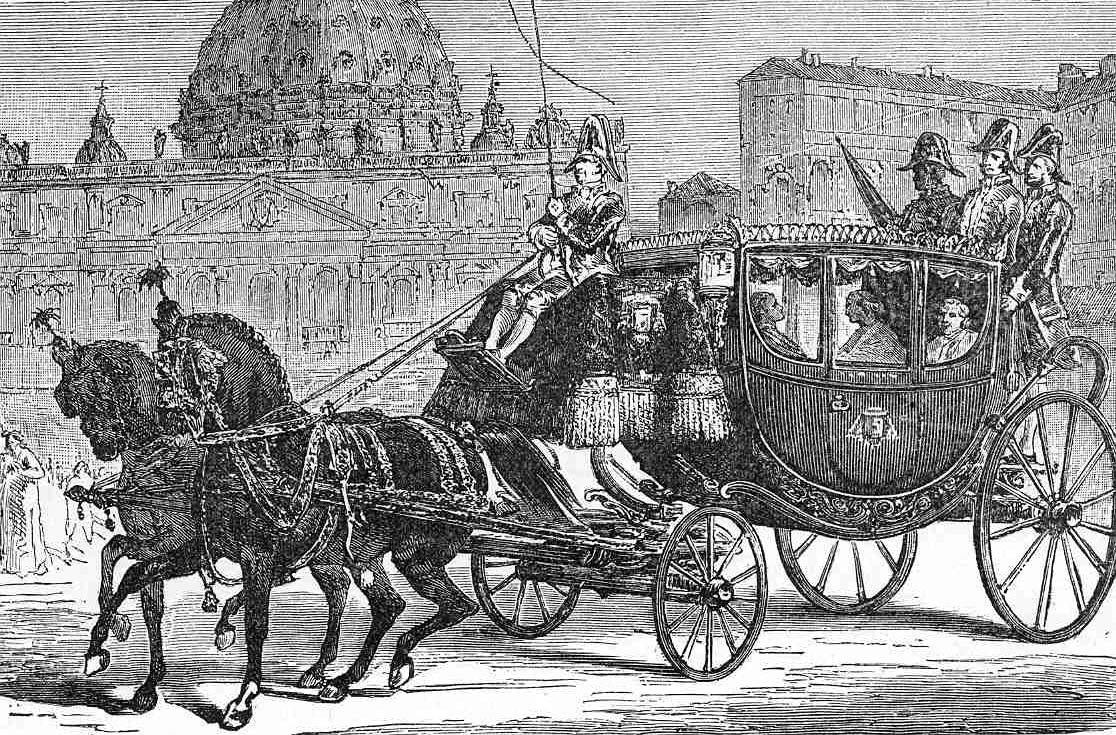
The Papal carriage of Pius IX

The Papal States were a theocracy in which the Catholic Church and Catholics had considerably more rights than members of other religions. Protestants and Jews were not admitted to the Papal government or to the social circles of Rome, nor did they have the same standing as members of the Catholic faith. The precise legal difference is difficult to pin down, as there existed no bill of rights or even a clear collection of laws in the Papal States at the time of Pius IX. Even ecclesiastical laws (canon law) were not formalized until 1917, some forty years after the death of Pope Pius IX.

Early in his pontificate, in 1847, Pius IX baptized four Roman Jews and welcomed them personally with warm words into the Catholic Church.

== Legislation ==
At Pius IX's accession in 1846, Catholicism and Judaism were the only religions allowed by law - Protestant worship was allowed to visiting foreigners, but forbidden to Italians; atheism was unthinkable. Jews in Rome were required to live in a ghetto, a separated quarter of the city, and had very limited rights. Pius' relations with them changed over time, from good to worse. He initially repealed laws that forbade Jews to practice certain professions, and rescinded laws which forced them to listen four times per year to sermons aimed at their conversion.

After the pope's 1849 overthrow, the short-lived Roman Republic issued a wide range of religious freedom measures. After French troops brought him back to power in 1850, the Pope issued a series of anti-liberal measures that eliminated even some of his earlier openings, including re-instituting the Ghetto.

== Mortara affair ==
In 1858 in a highly publicized case, a six-year-old Jewish boy, Edgardo Mortara, was seized from his parents by the police of the Papal States. He had reportedly been baptized by a Christian servant girl of the family while he was ill six years earlier, because she feared that otherwise he would go to Hell if he died. At that time, the Papal States law forbade Christians being raised by Jews, even their own parents, and considered the informal baptism performed by the teen-age servant a valid religious conversion. Pius IX thereafter steadfastly refused "to extradite a soul".

When a delegation of prominent Jews saw the Pope, he brought Mortara with him to show that the boy was happy in his care. In 1865 he said: "I had the right and the duty to do what I did for this boy, and if I had to, I would do it again."

Calls from The Times and from numerous heads of state including Emperor Franz Josef of Austria-Hungary and Emperor Napoleon III of France and Ambassador Gramont to return the child to his parents, were politely rejected. The young boy according to his own testimony wanted to stay, writing to his mother: "I am baptized. My Dad is the Pope, I would like to live with my family, if only they would become Christian, and I pray that they will." In 1870, as Don Pius Mortara, an ordained Catholic priest, Edgardo Mortara entered a monastery in Poitiers, France and later spoke out in favor of the beatification of Pope Pius IX, calling the pope "my father" once again. In his young life, however, Mortara could be visited by his parents, but only in the presence of other Roman Catholics.

== 1871 speech ==
In a speech in 1871 – after losing temporal authority over Rome – he said of certain anticlerical activists among the Jews of Rome: "Of these dogs, there are too many of them at present in Rome, and we hear them howling in the streets, and they are disturbing us in all places." An 1873 biography mentions his personal charity and indicates an implicit position against anti-semitism.

== Beatification debate ==
The beatification of Pope Pius IX, by Pope John Paul II, revived the controversy over the Pius IX and the Jews, including unfounded claims that Pius IX had "abused" Mortara, based on accounts of Edgardo hiding under the cassock of Pius IX.

Jewish groups and others, led by several descendants of the Mortara family, protested the Vatican's beatification of Pius in 2000. In 1997 David Kertzer published The Kidnapping of Edgardo Mortara, which brought the case back into public attention. The story became the subject of a play, Edgardo Mine by Alfred Uhry.

Jesuit Father Giacomo Martina, a professor at the Pontifical Gregorian University in Rome, wrote in a book about Pius's life: "In perspective, the Mortara story demonstrates the profound zeal of Pius IX [and] his firmness in carrying out what he perceived to be his duty at the cost of losing personal popularity." He also said the beatified pope regarded his critics as "unbelievers … [operating] a war machine against the church." Some senior Catholics continue to defend Pius's actions in the Mortara case.

In 1912, in his written statement in favor of the beatification of Pius IX, Edgardo Mortara recalled his own feelings about the abduction: "Eight days later, my parents presented themselves to the Institute of Neophytes to initiate the complex procedures to get me back in the family. As they had complete freedom to see me and talk with me, they remained in Rome for a month, coming every day to visit me. Needless to say, they tried every means to get me back – caresses, tears, pleas and promises. Despite all this, I never showed the slightest desire to return to my family, a fact which I do not understand myself, except by looking at the power of supernatural grace."

Monsignor Carlo Liberati, the church official who advanced Pius IX's beatification, said Pius should not be judged by the Mortara case: "In the process of beatification, this wasn't considered a problem because it was a habit of the times" to take baptized Jews and raise them as Catholics. "We can't look at the Church with the eyes of the year 2000, with all of the religious liberty that we have now," Liberati said. Liberati also said: "The servant girl wanted to give the grace of God to the child. She wanted him to go to heaven … [and] at the time, the spiritual paternity was more important than civil paternity." Based on the Catholic teaching, Extra Ecclesiam Nulla Salus ("outside the Church, there is no salvation"), the servant girl feared that Mortara would have gone to Hell for all eternity.

== Canonisation debate ==
In Italy, Jewish leaders and some Catholic scholars warned that the canonization of Pius IX will undermine the goodwill engendered by recent Vatican attempts to atone for Christian Europe's history of anti-Semitism. B'nai B'rith, a prominent Jewish group based in the United States, also protested against the campaign to canonize Pius. The Mortara case is thus once again a live issue in Jewish-Catholic relations.

In 1912, Mortara had testified in writing that he thought Pius IX should be canonized: "I am firmly convinced, not only by the deposition I have given, but by the entire life of my august protector and father, that the Servant of God Pius IX is a saint. I have the almost instinctive conviction that one day he will be raised to the glory of the altars. For me it will be an intimate joy for my entire life and a great comfort in the hour of my death to have cooperated to the limits of my strength toward the success of this cause. I pray to God, by the intercession of his Servant, to have mercy on me and forgive my sins, and make me rejoice in his presence in Paradise."

Elena Mortara, a great-great-granddaughter of one of Edgardo's sisters, and a professor of literature in Rome, continues to campaign for an apology from the Vatican for Edgardo's abduction and against the canonization of Pius IX. She has said she is "appalled at the idea that the Catholic Church wants to make a saint out of a Pope who perpetuated such an act of unacceptable intolerance and abuse of power." She explained that she "feels historically obliged in the name of my generation to ask [the Church] if this is the example you want to give."
