= Romanus Cessario =

American Dominican priest and theologian (born 1944)

The Reverend Romanus Cessario OP
- Church: Catholic Church

Orders
- Ordination: 27 May 1971

Personal details
- Born: Romanus Cessario; 1 April 1944 (age 82) Boston, Massachusetts, U.S.

Romanus Cessario OP (born April 1, 1944) is an American Dominican priest and theologian who is the Adam Cardinal Maida Professor of Theology at Ave Maria University. He completed his doctorate in theology at the University of Fribourg.

== Bibliography ==
- Christian Satisfaction in Aquinas (University Press of America, 1982)
- The Godly Image: Christ and Salvation in Catholic Thought from Anselm to Aquinas. Studies in Historical Theology VI (St. Bede's Publications, 1990)
- Meeting Christ in the Sacraments by Colman E. O’Neill, O.P., and revised by Romanus Cessario, O.P. (Alba House, 1991)
- The Moral Virtues and Theological Ethics (University of Notre Dame Press, 1991)
- Perpetual Angelus. As the Saints Pray the Rosary (Alba House, 1995)
- Christian Faith and the Theological Life (The Catholic University of America Press, 1996)
- A Love That Never Ends. A Key to the Catechism of the Catholic Church With J.A. DiNoia, B.G. O’Donnell, P.J. Cameron (Our Sunday Visitor Press, 1996)
- Veritatis Splendor and the Renewal of Moral Theology. Studies by Ten Outstanding Scholars Edited with J. A. DiNoia, O.P. (Midwest Theological Forum, 1999)
- Le thomisme et les thomistes (Les Éditions du Cerf, 1999)
- John Capreolus (1380–1444): Treatise on the Virtues Edited and Introduction with Kevin White (The Catholic University of America Press, 2001)
- Introduction to Moral Theology (The Catholic University of America Press, 2001)
- Boston’s Cardinal. Bernard Law, the Man and His Witness Edited with a Biographical Essay by Mary Ann Glendon (Lexington Books, 2002)
- The Virtues or the Examined Life (Continuum, 2002)
- A Short History of Thomism (Catholic University of America Press, 2005)
- The Moral Virtues and Theological Ethics Second Edition (University of Notre Dame Press, 2008)
- The Seven Last Words of Jesus (Magnificat, 2009)
- The Seven Joys of Mary (Magnificat, 2011)
- Philosophical Virtues and Psychological Strengths Edited with Craig Steven Titus and Paul C. Vitz (Sophia Institute Press, 2013)
- Introduction to Moral Theology Revised Edition (The Catholic University of America Press, 2013)
- The Seven Sorrows of Mary (Magnificat, 2014)
- Theology and Sanctity, ed. Cajetan Cuddy, O.P. (Sapientia Press, 2014)
- Compassionate Blood: Catherine of Siena on the Passion (Magnificat, 2016)
- Thomas and the Thomists: The Achievement of Thomas Aquinas and His Interpreters with Cajetan Cuddy, O.P. (Fortress Press, 2017)
- The Grace to Be a Priest (Cluny Media, 2017)
- The Godly Image. Christian Satisfaction in Aquinas (The Catholic University of America, 2020)
- Sanctifying Truth: Thomas Aquinas on Christian Holiness (Magnificat, 2021)
- The Seven Sacraments of the Catholic Church (Baker Academic, 2023)
