= Armand Lévy (activist) =

French lawyer and journalist (1827–1891)

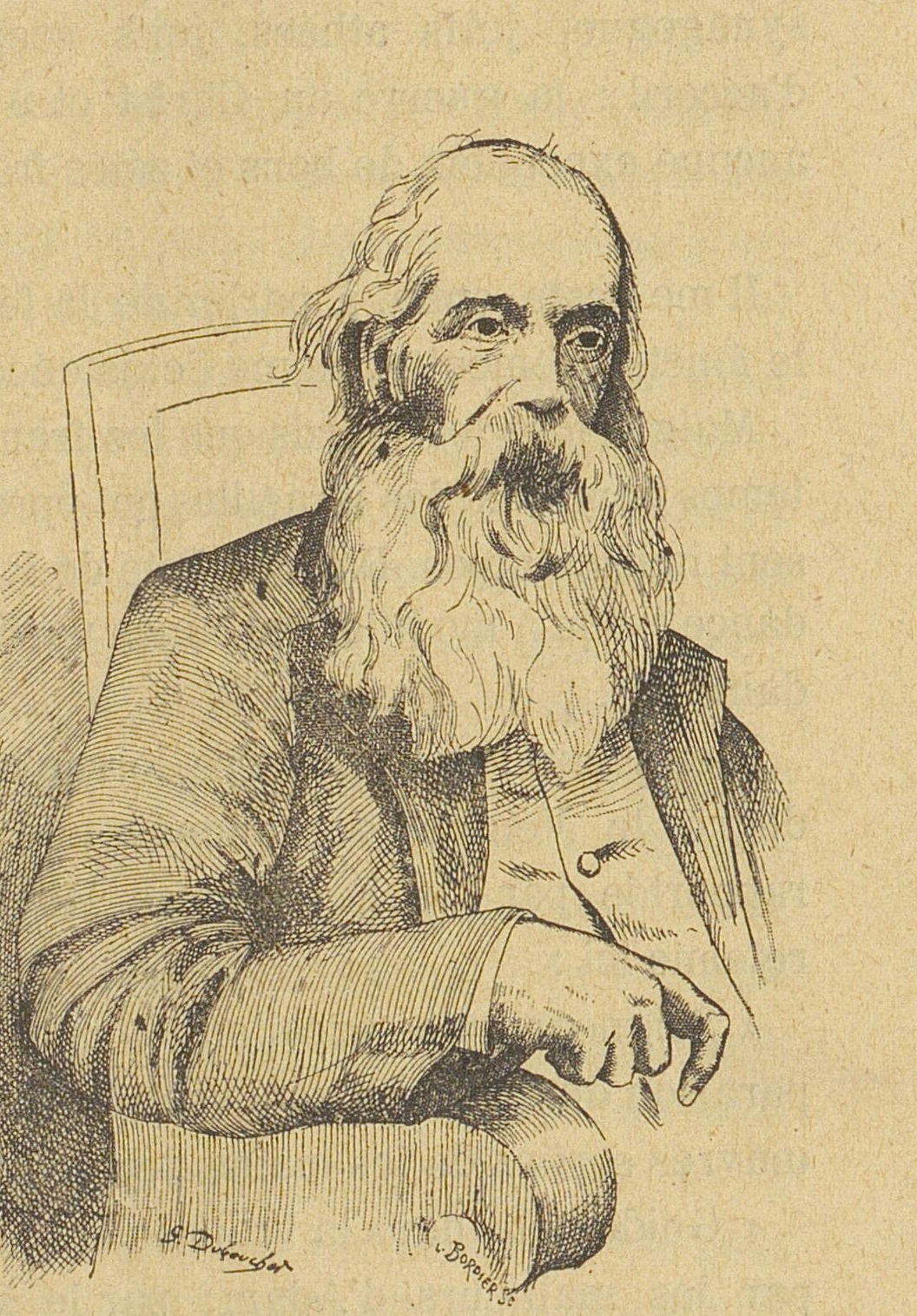

Armand Lévy (12 March 1827 in Précy-sous-Thil – 23 March 1891) was a French lawyer and journalist.

Lévy was an anti-clericalist, a freemason, a republican and a socialist who supported the 1848 Revolution and the Paris Commune. Born in a Roman Catholic family, but with a Jewish grand-father, he was passionate about the Jewish cause. He fought alongside his illustrious friends, such as Adam Mickiewicz, Ion Brătianu and Camillo Cavour, for the independence of Poland and Romania, and for the unification of Italy.

== Sources ==
- Armand Lévy's entry on the BnF website.
- "Un livre sur le rayonnement français en Europe au XIXe siècle". Annales. Économies, Sociétés, Civilisations (in French). 3: 779–783. 1972..
- "LÉVY Armand, François, Théodore". Le Maitron (in French). 29 September 2019.
