= New Hampshire Route 33 =

State highway in Rockingham County, New Hampshire, US

New Hampshire Route 33
- Map of Rockingham County in southeastern New Hampshire with NH 33 highlighted in red

Route information
- Maintained by NHDOT
- Length: 9.090 mi (14.629 km)

Major junctions
- West end: NH 108 in Stratham
- I-95 in Portsmouth
- East end: US 1 in Portsmouth

Location
- Country: United States
- State: New Hampshire
- Counties: Rockingham

Highway system
- New Hampshire Highway System; Interstate; US; State; Turnpikes
| ← NH 32 | → NH 38 |

New Hampshire Route 33 is a 9.090-mile-long (14.629 km) east–west highway in the Seacoast Region of southeastern New Hampshire, connecting Stratham with Portsmouth. The western terminus is at New Hampshire Route 108 in Stratham. The eastern terminus is at U.S. Route 1 (US 1) in downtown Portsmouth. It is a former routing of New Hampshire Route 101.

The road skirts the south side of Portsmouth International Airport at Pease.

== Route description ==
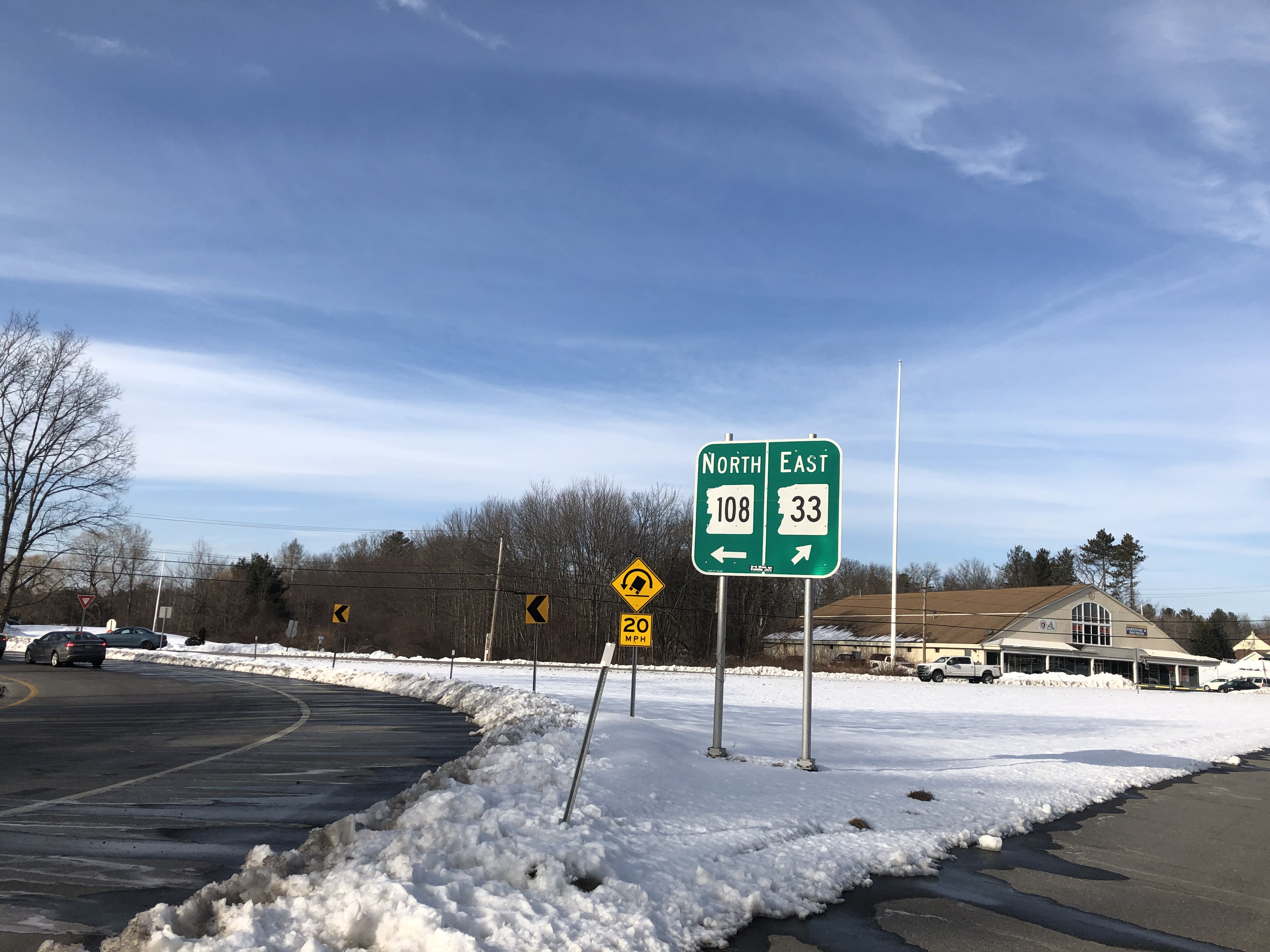
Route 33 western terminus at the traffic circle in Stratham, where it meets Route 108

NH 33 begins at the Stratham Traffic Circle where it meets NH 108. The route travels northeast, passing by Stratham Hill Park and curving to the east before crossing into the town of Greenland. NH 33 meets the northern terminus of NH 151 near the town center, then the highway bends to the northeast and enters the Portsmouth city limits.

NH 33, which is initially Greenland Road upon entering Portsmouth, passes the southern entrance to Pease International Tradeport then interchanges with Interstate 95 at a partial cloverleaf interchange (exit 3) and continues to the east, becoming Middle Road. NH 33 crosses over US 1 Bypass without an intersection before terminating at the intersection of Middle Road and Lafayette Road/Middle Street (US 1). US 1 provides local access to US 1 Bypass to the south.

NH 33 is poorly signed in downtown Portsmouth. The last eastbound and first westbound markers for NH 33 are at its intersection with Islington Street approximately 1 mile (1.6 km) west of US 1. NH 33 is unsigned from both Middle Street and Lafayette Road, and no other guide signs are present in the downtown area.

== History ==

The entirety of NH 33 was once the easternmost section of NH 101. In October 1994, NH 101 was re-routed along the former NH 51 from NH 108 in Stratham to Hampton Beach. At that time, what had been NH 101 from the Stratham Traffic Circle to its eastern terminus was designated as NH 33.

== Junction list ==
The entire route is in Rockingham County.

| Location | mi | km | Destinations | Notes |
|---|---|---|---|---|
| Stratham | 0.000 | 0.000 | NH 108 (College Road / Portsmouth Avenue) to NH 101 – Exeter, Newmarket | Western terminus |
| Greenland | 5.261 | 8.467 | NH 151 south (Portsmouth Avenue) – North Hampton, Hampton | Northern terminus of NH 151 |
| Portsmouth | 6.744– 7.340 | 10.853– 11.813 | I-95 – Boston, Portland | Exit 3 on I-95 |
| Portsmouth | 9.090 | 14.629 | US 1 (Middle Street / Lafayette Road) to US 1 Byp. / NH 1A – Portsmouth, Rye, Kittery ME | Eastern terminus |
1.000 mi = 1.609 km; 1.000 km = 0.621 mi
