= U.S. Route 1 in New Hampshire =

Segment of American highway

U.S. Route 1
- US 1 highlighted in red

Route information
- Maintained by NHDOT
- Length: 17.044 mi (27.430 km)
- Existed: 1926–present

Major junctions
- South end: US 1 in Salisbury, MA
- NH 101 in Hampton; US 1 Byp. in Portsmouth
- North end: US 1 in Kittery, ME

Location
- Country: United States
- State: New Hampshire
- Counties: Rockingham

Highway system
- United States Numbered Highway System; List; Special; Divided; New Hampshire Highway System; Interstate; US; State; Turnpikes
← I-393	→ NH 1A
← NH 1A	→ US 2

U.S. Route 1 (US 1) is a north–south U.S. Route is the U.S. state of New Hampshire through Hampton and Portsmouth. It lies between Interstate 95 (I-95) and New Hampshire Route 1A (NH 1A).

== Route description ==
US 1 begins in Seabrook at the border with Salisbury, Massachusetts. The route closely parallels I-95 along Lafayette Road for a majority of its 17-mile (27 km) stretch in the state. US 1 travels through Hampton, North Hampton, and finally enters Portsmouth. The main route turns into downtown while US 1 Bypass (US 1 Byp.) travels toward I-95 and the Spaulding Turnpike made up of US 4 and NH 16 in the general direction toward Concord and the Lakes Region/White Mountains. US 1 Byp. terminates at US 1 in Kittery, Maine, at a rotary intersection with State Route 236 and I-95 with connections to the Maine Turnpike toward Portland. US 1 travels down State Street going toward Maine and Market Street into Portsmouth.

== History ==
US 1 follows the historic Lafayette Road through New Hampshire, named after the Revolutionary War officer the Marquis de Lafayette, who passed over the road in 1825.

For a period of time during the 1950s, a segment of US 1 in Massachusetts and New Hampshire was routed onto what later became I-95. Roadway that had been US 1 was designated as Route 17 from Danvers to Salisbury and NH 17 for a short distance in Seabrook. Once the I-95 designation was adopted, Route 17 and NH 17 were restored to being US 1.

=== Memorial Bridge replacement ===
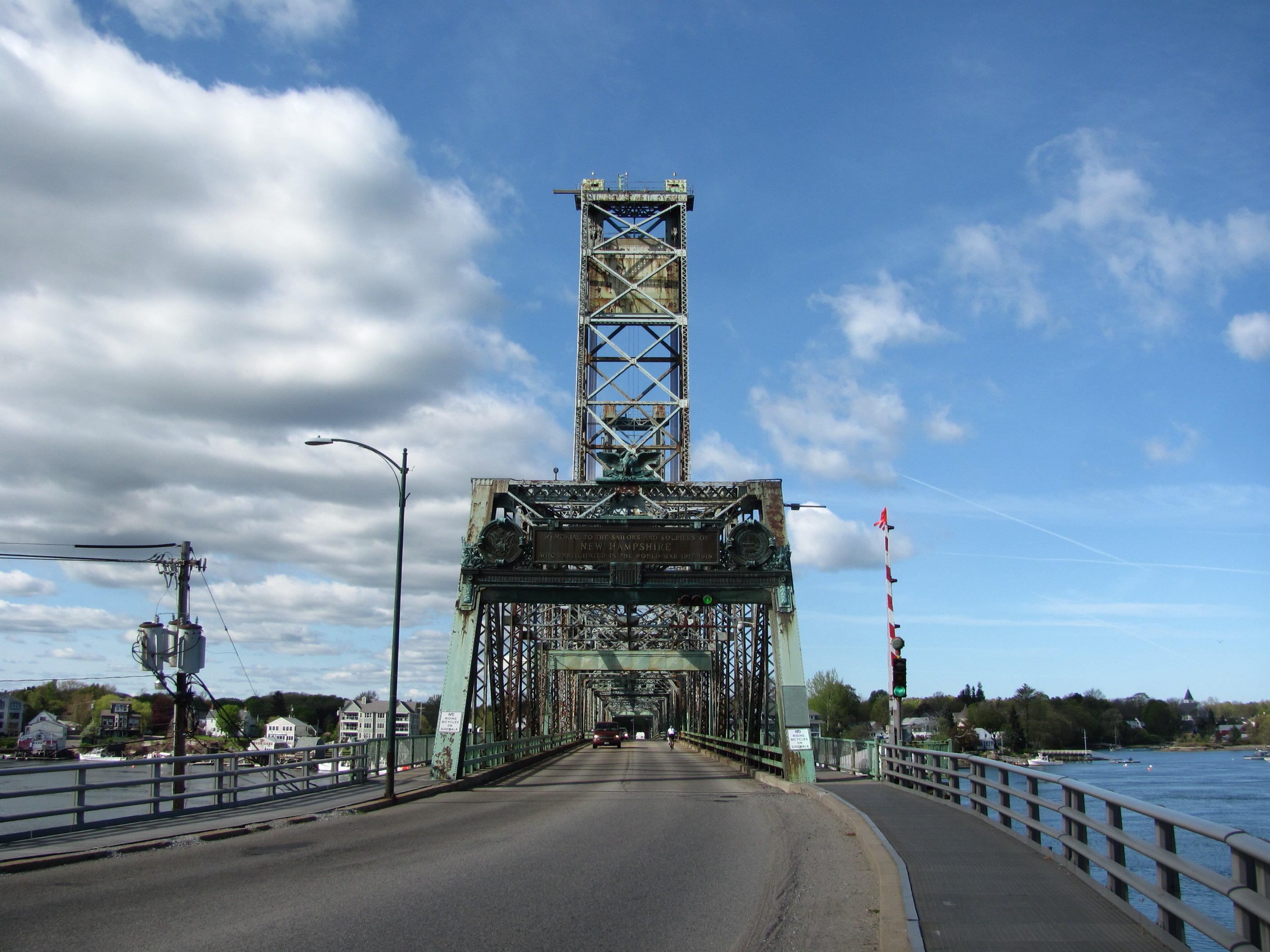
The old Memorial Bridge in Portsmouth, which carried US 1 across the Piscataqua River before its closure in July 2011. It was replaced by a newer drawbridge which opened in August 2013.

The original Memorial Bridge, which formerly carried US 1 over the Piscataqua River between New Hampshire and Maine, was closed to motorists in July 2011 due to numerous safety and structural concerns. This was a permanent closure following two instances in 2009 and 2010 when the bridge was closed for emergency repairs. The bridge was left open to pedestrians and bicyclists, as it was the only of the three river bridges allowing for these methods of travel. On January 9, 2012, the bridge was closed to pedestrians and cyclists as well. The middle lift section was removed on February 8, leaving a 300-foot (91 m) gap in US 1.

Over the next two years, the bridge was demolished and removed, and a new drawbridge was constructed in its place. In the interim, access to US 1 on each side of the gap was facilitated by either the Sarah Mildred Long Bridge, which carries US 1 Byp., or the Piscataqua River Bridge which carries I-95. The New Hampshire Department of Transportation operated hourly shuttle service between Portsmouth and Kittery while the new bridge was constructed.

The new bridge was officially dedicated at a ceremony on the New Hampshire side of the span just before noon on August 8, 2013. Former Portsmouth Mayor Eileen Foley cut the red ribbon, 90 years after she performed the same honors for the original span in 1923 when she was five years old. The bridge initially opened to only pedestrians and bicyclists. The new bridge—constructed over two previously existing piers—opened to vehicular traffic at 2:00 pm first with southbound traffic (Maine to New Hampshire), then northbound. Finishing work on the bridge was completed in late 2013.

== Major intersections ==
The entire route is in Rockingham County.

Location	mi	km	Destinations	Notes
Seabrook	0.000	0.000	US 1 south (Lafayette Road) – Salisbury, Newburyport	Continuation into Massachusetts
Seabrook	1.466	2.359	NH 107 north to I-95 – Kingston, Boston, MA	Southern terminus of NH 107
Hampton Falls	3.082	4.960	NH 84 west (Kensington Road) – Kensington	Eastern terminus of NH 84
Hampton Falls	3.121	5.023	NH 88 west (Exeter Road) – Exeter	Eastern terminus of NH 88
Hampton	4.805	7.733	NH 101 to I-95 / NH 1A – Exeter, Manchester, Hampton Beach	Interchange
Hampton	5.407	8.702	NH 101E east (Winnacunnet Road)	Western terminus of NH 101E
Hampton	5.675	9.133	NH 27 (Exeter Road/High Street) – Exeter, Hampton Beach	
Hampton	6.957	11.196	NH 151 north (Post Road) – Greenland	Southern terminus of NH 151.
North Hampton	7.996	12.868	NH 111 (Atlantic Avenue) – Exeter, Rye Beach	
Portsmouth	14.662	23.596	US 1 Byp. north / I-95 / US 4 / NH 16 – Dover, Maine	Southern terminus of US 1 Bypass
Portsmouth	15.232	24.514	NH 33 west (Middle Road)	Eastern terminus of NH 33 (unsigned)
Portsmouth	15.976	25.711	NH 1A south (Miller Avenue)	Northern terminus of NH 1A (unsigned)
Portsmouth	16.407	26.405	NH 1B south (Marcy Street) – New Castle	Northern terminus of NH 1B (unsigned)
Portsmouth	16.662– 17.044	26.815– 27.430	Memorial Bridge over Piscataqua River	
Portsmouth	17.044	27.430	US 1 north – Kittery	Continuation into Maine
1.000 mi = 1.609 km; 1.000 km = 0.621 mi

== Auxiliary routes ==
=== U.S. Route 1 Bypass ===
U.S. Route 1 Bypass
- Location: Portsmouth–Kittery, Maine
- Length: 4.3 mi (6.9 km)

U.S. Route 1 Bypass (US 1 Byp.) is a 4.3-mile (6.9 km) bypass of US 1 in Portsmouth and Kittery, Maine. The route runs for 2.7 miles (4.3 km) in New Hampshire and is mostly a four-lane divided semi-limited-access freeway, although two four-way traffic signals are present south of the Portsmouth traffic circle. The southern terminus is at US 1 (Lafayette Road) just south of downtown. The highway continues northwest to the traffic circle, where it then turns northeast. US 1 Byp. crosses the Sarah Mildred Long Bridge and continues into Kittery, Maine.

=== New Hampshire Route 1A ===
New Hampshire Route 1A
- Location: Seabrook–Portsmouth
- Length: 18.32 mi (29.48 km)

New Hampshire Route 1A (NH 1A) is an 18.32-mile (29.48 km) auxiliary of US 1 which runs along the Atlantic coastline. It runs from the Massachusetts border north to Rye, then turns toward downtown Portsmouth. The southern terminus of NH 1A is at the state line in Seabrook where it continues south as Route 1A. The northern terminus is at the junction with US 1 (Lafayette Road) in Portsmouth. For the length of the road’s run along the shore, its local name is Ocean Boulevard. In Portsmouth, it is known as Miller Avenue and Sagamore Avenue.

=== New Hampshire Route 1B ===
New Hampshire Route 1B
- Location: Portsmouth/New Castle
- Length: 4.808 mi (7.738 km)

New Hampshire Route 1B (NH 1B) is a 4.808-mile (7.738 km) auxiliary of US 1 serving the town of New Castle.

The southern terminus is at NH 1A in Portsmouth, near the city's southeastern boundary. The road loops around over Great Island in the Piscataqua River through New Castle and then back into downtown Portsmouth. The northern terminus is at the junction with US 1 at Prescott Park, near the Maine state line. The highway is signed north–south but forms a half-loop for most of its route.

Due to US 1 being routed onto the Memorial Bridge adjacent to the intersection with NH 1B, traffic from NH 1B must loop around State Street and Harbor Place to access US 1 in either direction. Harbor Place defaults onto Daniel Street, which carries US 1 south into Market Square. A hard left onto Wight Avenue will cross over to US 1 north to Maine. Southbound traffic on US 1 must use Chapel and State streets to access NH 1B.

==== Junction list ====
The entire route is in Rockingham County.

Location	mi	km	Destinations	Notes
Portsmouth	0.000	0.000	NH 1A (Sagamore Avenue) – Rye, Portsmouth	Southern terminus of NH 1B
Portsmouth	4.808	7.738	US 1 (State Street / Daniel Street) – Portsmouth, Kittery, ME	Northern terminus of NH 1B; access is via intersecting streets (see above)
1.000 mi = 1.609 km; 1.000 km = 0.621 mi: Incomplete access

== See also ==
=== Related routes ===
- U.S. Route 1 Bypass, a mostly-freeway bypass of downtown Portsmouth
- New England Interstate Route 1, the designation of US 1 prior to 1926

U.S. Route 1
Previous state: Massachusetts	New Hampshire	Next state: Maine
