= List of exits on Interstate 95 =

The Interstate 95 exit list has been divided by state:

- Interstate 95 in Florida#Exit list
- Interstate 95 in Georgia#Exit list
- Interstate 95 in South Carolina#Exit list
- Interstate 95 in North Carolina#Exit list
- Interstate 95 in Virginia#Exit list
- Interstate 95 in Maryland#Exit list
- Interstate 95 in Delaware#Exit list
- Interstate 95 in Pennsylvania#Exit list
- Interstate 95 in New Jersey#Exit list
- Interstate 95 in New York#Exit list
- Interstate 95 in Connecticut#Exit list
- Interstate 95 in Rhode Island#Exit list
- Interstate 95 in Massachusetts#Exit list
- Interstate 95 in New Hampshire#Exit list
- Interstate 95 in Maine#Exit list
