= Portsmouth Traffic Circle =

Location
- Portsmouth, NH
- Coordinates: 43.072681°N 70.780685°W
- Roads at junction: I-95 (Blue Star Turnpike) US 1 Bypass; US 4 NH 16 Spaulding Turnpike

Construction
- Type: Rotary

The Portsmouth Traffic Circle is a four-point rotary in the city of Portsmouth, New Hampshire.

== Description ==
The southern exit of the circle provides access to Interstate 95 north and south, although only northbound I-95 traffic enters here. The eastern and northern exits are part of the U.S. Route 1 Bypass, and the western exit marks the eastern end of U.S. Route 4, as well as the southern terminus of NH Route 16 and the Spaulding Turnpike. Traffic from southbound I-95 also enters the circle here after navigating a circuitous series of ramps from exit 5.

Drivers leaving the circle to join I-95 can head south towards Massachusetts or north to Maine. The circle also provides motorists with a connection to Kittery, Maine, and originally linked the NH Turnpike to the Maine Turnpike, via US 1 Bypass North. The portion of the Bypass south from the circle leads to US 1 and the seacoast region. US 4 travels west toward Concord, while the Spaulding Turnpike and NH 16 link the seacoast with the lakes region and the White Mountains.

According to the NHDOT, the "length" of the traffic circle is 0.25 miles (0.40 km).

== History ==
When it was built, the circle marked the northern terminus of the New Hampshire Turnpike, later designated as part of Interstate 95, and linked the NH Turnpike with the Spaulding Turnpike to form what the New Hampshire Department of Transportation's Bureau of Turnpikes collectively terms the "Eastern Turnpike". The NH Turnpike has since incorporated the remainder of I-95 in NH to the Piscataqua River Bridge.
