= NH 86 =

NH 86 may refer to:

- National Highway 86 (India)
- New Hampshire Route 86, United States
