= New Hampshire Route 151 =

State highway in Rockingham County, New Hampshire, US

New Hampshire Route 151
- Map of Rockingham County in southeastern New Hampshire with NH 151 highlighted in red

Route information
- Maintained by NHDOT
- Length: 6.370 mi (10.252 km)

Major junctions
- South end: US 1 in North Hampton
- NH 111 in North Hampton
- North end: NH 33 in Greenland

Location
- Country: United States
- State: New Hampshire
- Counties: Rockingham

Highway system
- New Hampshire Highway System; Interstate; US; State; Turnpikes
← NH 150	→ NH 152

New Hampshire Route 151 (abbreviated NH 151) is a 6.370-mile-long (10.252 km) north–south highway in Rockingham County in southeastern New Hampshire. The road runs between North Hampton and Greenland. NH 151 is locally named Post Road. For most of its length, NH 151 parallels Interstate 95, but there are no interchanges with I-95.

The southern terminus of NH 151 is at U.S. Route 1 (Lafayette Road) in North Hampton. The northern terminus is at New Hampshire Route 33 near the Pease International Tradeport in Greenland.

== Major intersections ==
The entire route is in Rockingham County.

Location	mi	km	Destinations	Notes
Hampton	0.000	0.000	US 1 (Lafayette Road) – Hampton, North Hampton	Southern terminus
North Hampton	1.464	2.356	NH 111 (Exeter Road / Atlantic Avenue) to US 1 – Exeter, North Hampton	Brief concurrency southbound with NH 111
Greenland	6.370	10.252	NH 33 (Greenland Road) to I-95 – Stratham, Portsmouth	Northern terminus
1.000 mi = 1.609 km; 1.000 km = 0.621 mi
