= NH 1A =

NH 1A may refer to:

- National Highway 1A (India)
- New Hampshire Route 1A, United States
