= Piscataqua River Bridge =

Bridge in New Hampshire and Maine, US

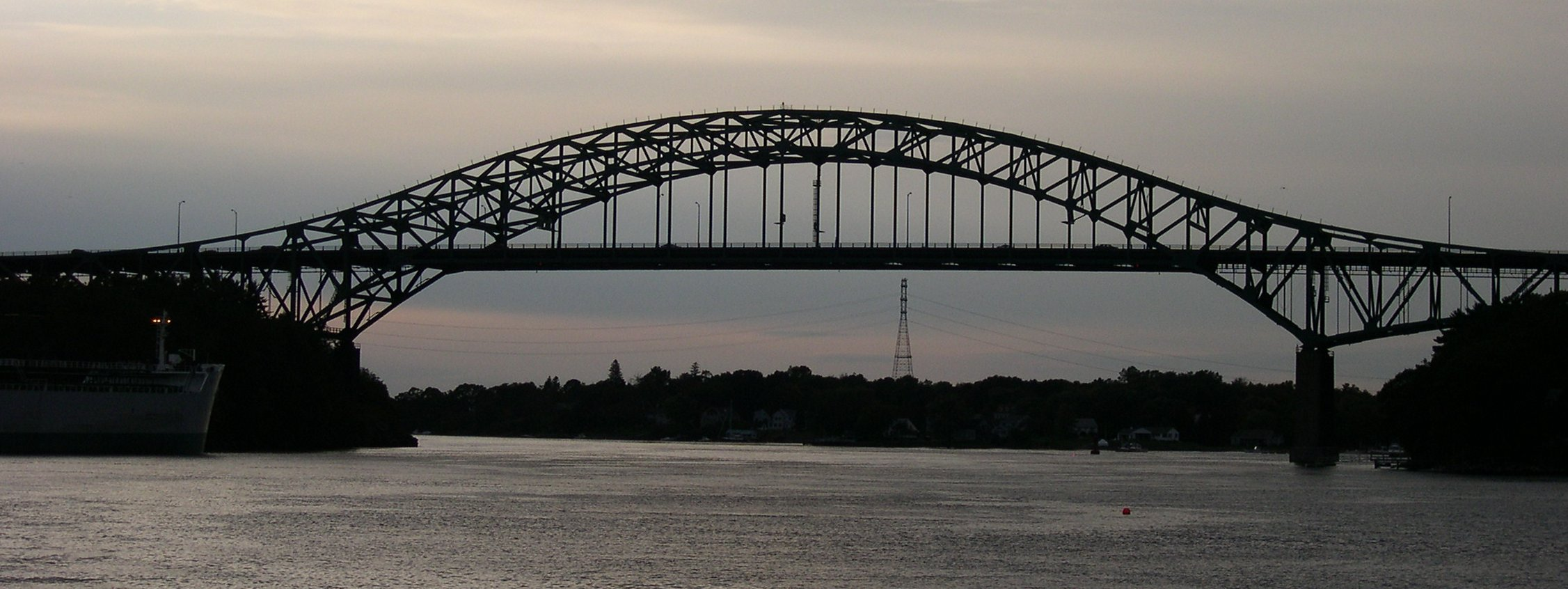
- The Piscataqua River Bridge seen from the Sarah Mildred Long Bridge
- Coordinates: 43.092788°N 70.766158°W
- Carries: I-95
- Crosses: Piscataqua River
- Locale: Portsmouth, New Hampshire and Kittery, Maine
- Official name: Piscataqua River Bridge
- Maintained by: New Hampshire Department of Transportation
- ID number: 021702580012800

Characteristics
- Design: Steel through arch bridge
- Total length: 1372.5 m (4,503 ft)
- Width: 29.9 m (98 ft)
- Clearance above: 7.1 m (23.3 ft)
- Clearance below: 41.1 m (134.8 ft)

History
- Opened: November 1, 1972; 54 years ago

Statistics
- Daily traffic: 60,700 (1990)

Location
- Interactive map of Piscataqua River Bridge

The Piscataqua River Bridge is a through arch bridge that crosses the Piscataqua River, connecting Portsmouth, New Hampshire with Kittery, Maine, United States. Carrying six lanes of Interstate 95, the bridge is the third modern span and first fixed crossing of the Piscataqua between Portsmouth and Kittery. The two other spans, the Memorial Bridge and the Sarah Mildred Long Bridge, are both lift bridges, built to accommodate ship traffic along the Piscataqua. The high arch design of the Piscataqua River Bridge eliminates the need for a movable roadway.

== History ==
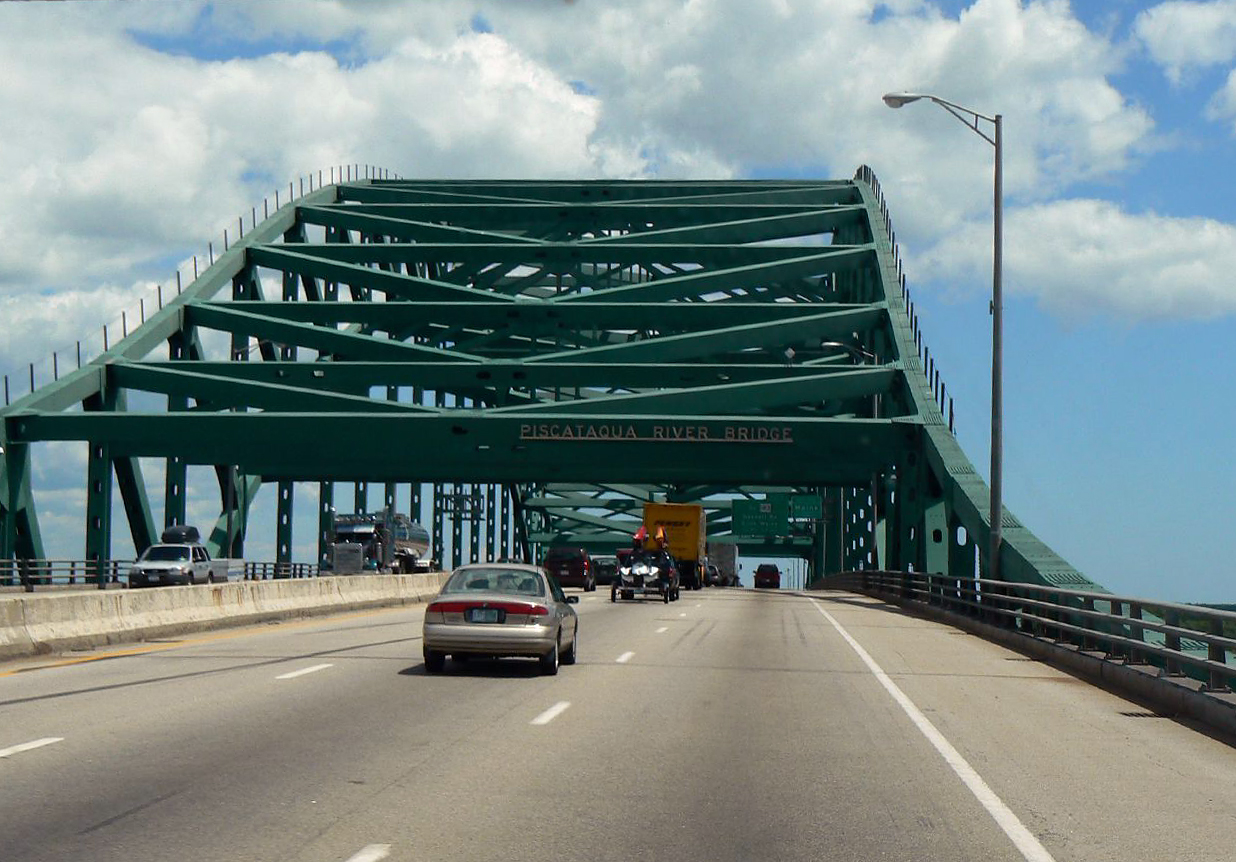
Approaching the main span from New Hampshire

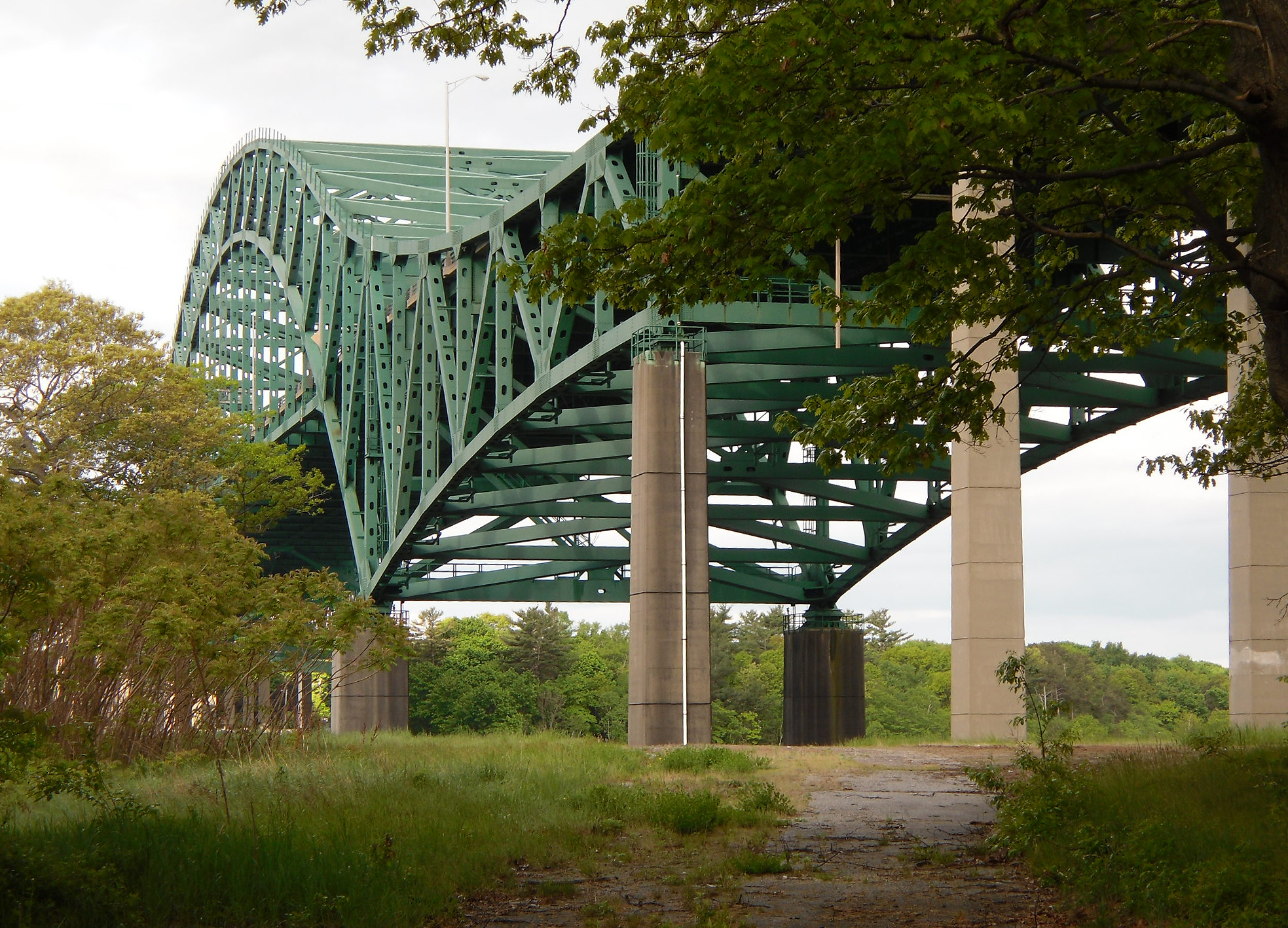
Reinforced concrete piers support the bridge (seen from the Maine side).

The development of the Interstate Highway System required new roads to be constructed and existing ones to be absorbed into the network. In New Hampshire, Interstate 95 (I-95) was routed along the New Hampshire Turnpike, which had opened to traffic in 1950, and paralleled U.S. Route 1 through New Hampshire's Seacoast region from the Massachusetts border to the Turnpike's end at the Portsmouth Traffic Circle. A gap remained between the traffic circle and the beginning of the Maine Turnpike on the other side of the Piscataqua River, filled by the US-1 Bypass. It crossed the river using the two-lane Sarah Mildred Long lift bridge, which was far from meeting Interstate Highway standards for four-lane highways and fixed spans.

The decision was made to extend I-95 north from the New Hampshire Turnpike at Portsmouth and south from the Maine Turnpike in Kittery, and join the roads with a high-speed fixed span over the Piscataqua. A drawing of the proposed bridge was published in area newspapers as early as June 1967.

Work on the bridge began in 1968 and was completed in 1971, with the I-95 extension to it in Maine completed the following year. The bridge was officially opened on November 1, 1972, in a ceremony attended by the Governor of New Hampshire, Walter R. Peterson Jr., and the Governor of Maine, Kenneth M. Curtis.

The bridge's steel construction received an award of merit in 1973 from the American Institute of Steel Construction, and in 1974 was the winning entry a contest by the United States Department of Transportation as the country's outstanding bridge.

The bridge was repainted in the early 2000s.

A major rehabilitation and repair project began in 2019 and was expected to last until 2022.

=== Incidents ===
Tragedy struck the site about midway through construction. On June 24, 1970, two of the I-beams supporting the staging area on the Kittery side of the span gave way, plunging four workers 75 feet (23 m) to their deaths and leaving another seven injured. A memorial plaque was placed beneath the bridge on the Maine side, visible from Maine Route 103.

Since the bridge opened, there have been various instances of people jumping off the structure, many (but not all) of which have proved fatal—examples of such events, along with other incidents reported in area newspapers, follow in this section.

On March 21, 1980, a 27-year-old woman jumped from the bridge after pushing her 4-year-old daughter off the structure; both survived what was believed to be a murder-suicide attempt. The incident led to Maine and New Hampshire working to identify exact state boundaries on the bridge, in order to determine jurisdiction. On October 12, 1989, a New Hampshire contractor died of head injuries while working on the bridge; his employer was later fined by OSHA for safety violations.

On March 11, 1998, an empty car, still running, was found on the bridge—its driver was believed to have jumped, but no body was found. On January 23, 1999, Maine State Police approached a man who had been walking in one of the bridge's traffic lanes, but the man jumped before police could speak with him; no body was found.

On July 8, 2000, a man jumped from the bridge; his body was found later that month by lobstermen. On August 1, 2012, a man who had ridden his bicycle onto the bridge jumped; despite an extensive search, no body was found.

On May 5, 2022, a man experiencing a mental health crisis and threatening to jump off the bridge was successfully talked down by members of the Maine State Police following a two-hour dialogue.

In the early morning hours of August 29, 2024, officers of the New Hampshire State Police and Maine State Police shot a man on the bridge, after he exited his parked vehicle and raised a weapon. The man's body fell into the river below, and was later recovered by the Coast Guard. An investigation by the Maine Attorney General's office later determined that the man died due to a self-inflicted gunshot prior to falling off the bridge. In the afternoon of October 27, 2024, a man who jumped from the bridge was rescued by New Hampshire Marine Patrol personnel, then transported to a local hospital; per subsequent news reports, the man survived and was identified as Eli Robinson, brother of professional basketball player Duncan Robinson. On December 3, 2024, police successfully convinced a man having a mental health crisis to climb down from structure on the bridge, after he appeared likely to jump. On December 12, 2024, an officer with the Biddeford, Maine, police department was killed in an accident on the Maine side of the bridge shortly after 1 a.m. as he was returning to his home in Portsmouth.

On April 30, 2025, a man jumped from the bridge and was recovered from the water below, but later died at an area hospital; media reports later identified the man as Eli Robinson, who had survived a jump from the bridge six months prior. On May 11, 2025, a juvenile died by suicide by jumping from the bridge; the body was recovered the following morning. On June 6, 2025, a man experiencing a mental health crisis and who appeared to be suicidal was successfully talked down by a Kittery police officer after straddling the bridge's railing.

=== Suicide prevention measures ===
In May 2025, the frequency of suicides from the bridge led the New Hampshire Department of Transportation to install signs giving contact information to the Suicide and Crisis Lifeline.

In June 2025, a group of stakeholders—including law enforcement, mental health providers, and officials from New Hampshire and Maine—began to meet regarding suicide prevention for the bridge, such as possibly installing suicide barriers. In April 2026, following a feasibility study by an engineering consulting company, suicide barriers were recommended for the bridge.
