= New Hampshire Liquor Commission =

Government agency in the U.S. state of New Hampshire

Agency overview
- Formed: 1934
- Jurisdiction: New Hampshire
- Headquarters: 50 Storrs Street; Concord, New Hampshire
- Agency executives: Joseph W. Mollica, Chairman; Nicole Brassard Jordan, Deputy Commissioner
- Website: gov.liquorandwineoutlets.com

The New Hampshire Liquor Commission (NHLC) is a government agency of the U.S. state of New Hampshire. The commission regulates the sale of alcoholic beverages in New Hampshire, one of 17 alcoholic beverage control states.

The commission became operational in 1934, following repeal of Prohibition in the United States in 1933. The commission is led by a chairperson, currently Joseph W. Mollica. The chairperson nominates a deputy commissioner for appointment by the Governor of New Hampshire with the consent of the Governor's Council. The current deputy commissioner is Nicole Brassard Jordan.

== Organization ==
The New Hampshire Liquor Commission has three divisions: the Division of Marketing, Merchandising, and Warehousing; the Division of Administration; and the Division of Enforcement and Licensing.

- Division of Marketing, Merchandising, and Warehousing – Operates the retail and wholesale business part of the Commission. It is responsible for the operation of all state liquor stores, merchandising, advertising, warehousing and transportation.
- Division of Administrative Services – Responsible for information technology, human resource management, plant maintenance, general administrative support to the Commission, and liaison activities with the Governor & Executive Council, the Legislature, and other state agencies. Financial Administration is also under the Division of Administrative Services.
- Division of Enforcement and Licensing – Responsible for the licensure of all private businesses engaged in the manufacture, transportation, distribution and sales of alcoholic beverages with the state. Provides education, awareness and outreach programming for licensees, other law enforcement and public groups. Enforcement of the state's alcoholic beverage laws and administrative code of rules. The Division of Enforcement also performs security and asset protection function for the Commission and its retail outlets.

A Liquor & Wine Outlet in Penacook, New Hampshire
