= U.S. Route 1 Bypass (Portsmouth, New Hampshire–Kittery, Maine) =

Highway bypass in the United States

U.S. Route 1 Bypass

Route information
- Auxiliary route of US 1
- Length: 4.32 mi (6.95 km) New Hampshire: 2.756 miles (4.435 km); Maine: 1.56 miles (2.51 km)
- Existed: 1940–present

Major junctions
- South end: US 1 in Portsmouth, NH
- I-95 / US 4 / NH 16 / Spaulding Turnpike in Portsmouth, NH
- North end: US 1 in Kittery, ME

Location
- Country: United States
- Counties: Rockingham (NH), York (ME)

Highway system
- United States Numbered Highway System; List; Special; Divided
- New Hampshire Highway System; Interstate; US; State; Turnpikes
- Maine State Highway System; Interstate; US; State; Auto trails; Lettered highways

U.S. Route 1 Bypass (US 1 Byp.) is a 4.3-mile-long (6.9 km) bypass of U.S. Route 1 in Portsmouth, New Hampshire and Kittery, Maine. Most of its north section, northeast of the Portsmouth Traffic Circle where it meets the Blue Star Turnpike (Interstate 95 or I-95) and Spaulding Turnpike, is built to rudimentary freeway standards, with no cross traffic but driveway access. The southern portion is similarly constructed, although there are two four-way intersections with traffic lights just south of the circle and a third at its south end, just before intersecting with US 1.

== Route description ==
=== New Hampshire ===
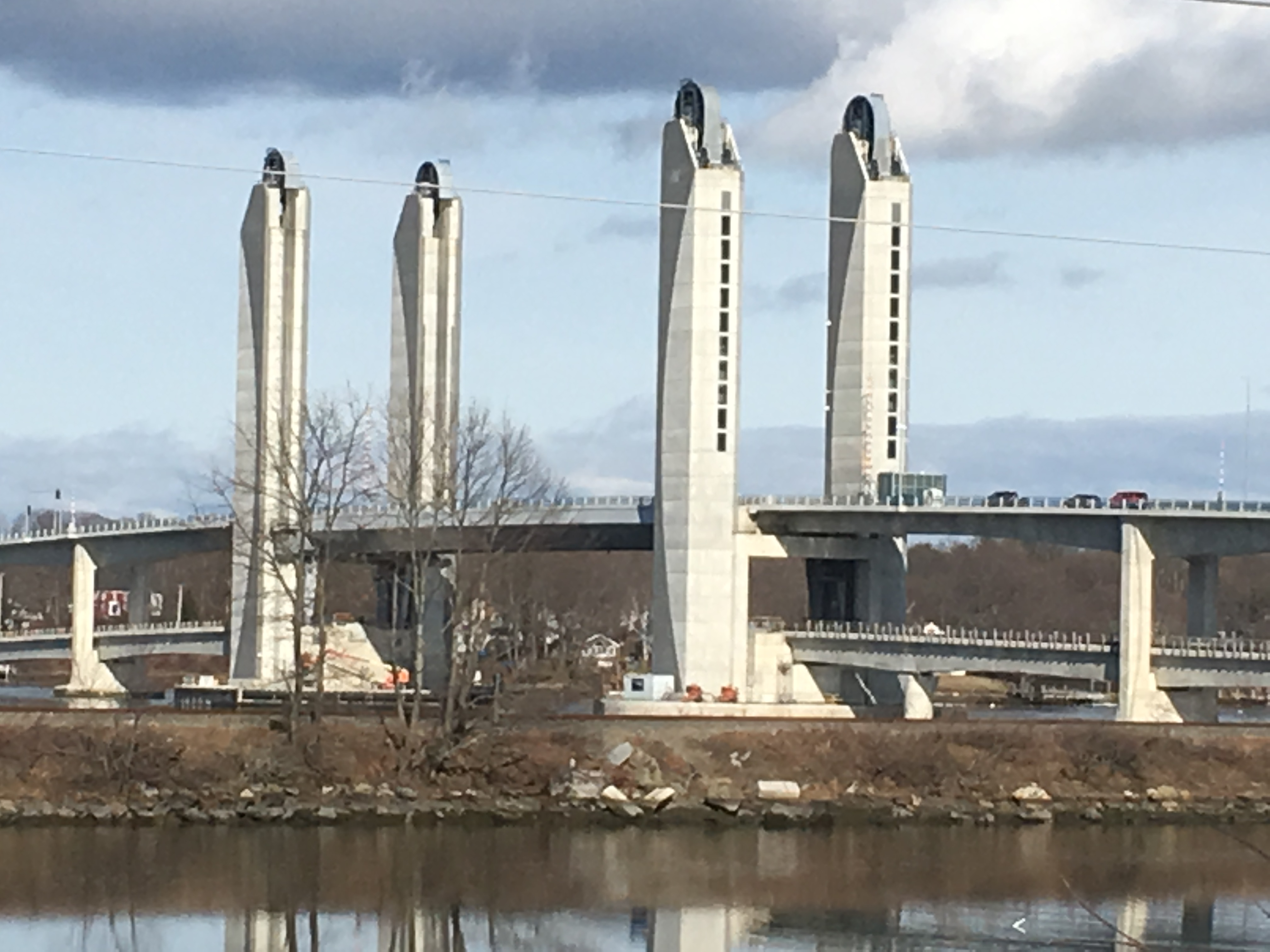
The Sarah Mildred Long Bridge (2018) carrying US 1 Byp. between New Hampshire and Maine

US 1 Bypass begins at US 1 (Lafayette Road) south of downtown Portsmouth. Formerly a half-interchange with limited access and a flyover ramp, the old interchange was converted to a standard three-way intersection with full access in 2013. US 1 Bypass heads northwest and has two at-grade intersections with Borthwick Avenue and Coakley Road/Cottage Street before it comes to a large rotary, the Portsmouth Traffic Circle, where it interchanges with I-95 and the southern end of the Spaulding Turnpike/New Hampshire Route 16 (NH 16) and the eastern terminus of US 4. US 1 Bypass enters the circle from the southeast and leaves via the first exit, turning to the northeast towards Maine.

Upon leaving the rotary, US 1 Bypass immediately interchanges with Woodbury Avenue, which provides access to downtown and directly serves the retail district of Newington. The highway continues northeast, interchanging with Maplewood Avenue, and crossing over Market Street before reaching the Piscataqua River and crossing it on the Sarah Mildred Long Bridge.

=== Maine ===
Continuing north from the bridge, US 1 Bypass interchanges with Bridge Street (northbound) and Oak Terrace (southbound), local roads which provide a connection to Maine State Route 103 (SR 103). The remaining stretch of highway ceases to be limited-access, with local businesses and parking lots straddling the roadway. The final northbound exit connects to US 1 and SR 236. This ramp best serves SR 236 northbound, which connects to I-95, and US 1 southbound for drivers destined for southern Kittery, Badgers Island, or returning to Portsmouth. The mainline of US 1 Bypass merges directly onto US 1 northbound, which provides a direct connection to I-95 north and the Maine Turnpike. US 1 Bypass southbound has exits for I-95 south and north as well as SR 236 at the northern terminus.

In Maine, US 1 Bypass was originally designated in 1960 as US 1A. Although it is signed as a bypass, MaineDOT still includes the mileage of US 1 Bypass as part of US 1A.

== History ==
The Maine–New Hampshire Interstate Bridge, carrying the bypass and railroads over the Piscataqua River, opened to traffic on November 8, 1940.

=== 2016 bridge closure ===
The Sarah Mildred Long Bridge, a double-decker lift bridge built in 1940 which carried US 1 Bypass and a railroad bed over the Piscataqua River, was closed on August 21, 2016, after its lift system failed. Demolition began two months later and a $158.5 million replacement bridge underwent construction. The new bridge was expected to open to traffic in November 2017, but did not open until March 2018. Until that time, traffic was required to use either the Piscataqua River Bridge (I-95) or the Memorial Bridge (US 1) to cross between Portsmouth and Kittery.

== Junction list ==
State	County	Location	mi	km	Destinations	Notes
New Hampshire	Rockingham	Portsmouth	0.000	0.000	US 1 (Lafayette Road) – Portsmouth Downtown	Southern terminus
New Hampshire	Rockingham	Portsmouth	1.413	2.274	I-95 / US 4 west / NH 16 north / Spaulding Turnpike north – Maine, Massachusetts, Concord, Dover, Rochester	Portsmouth Traffic Circle; exit 5 on I-95; eastern terminus of US 4; southern terminus of NH 16
Piscataqua River			2.756 0.00	4.435 0.00	Sarah Mildred Long Bridge; New Hampshire–Maine state line	
Maine	York	Kittery	0.29	0.47	To SR 103 – Navy Yard, Kittery Foreside, Eliot	Access via Bridge Street
Maine	York	Kittery	1.24	2.00	SR 236 – Kittery Point, Eliot, Navy Yard, South Berwick	Northbound exit and southbound entrance
Maine	York	Kittery	1.56	2.51	US 1 north to I-95 / Maine Turnpike – Portland, Augusta	Northern terminus
1.000 mi = 1.609 km; 1.000 km = 0.621 mi: Incomplete access

== See also ==
- New Hampshire Historical Marker No. 234: US Route 1 Bypass of Portsmouth, NH (1940)
