= Seacoast Region (New Hampshire) =

Coordinates: 42°58′0″N 70°49′0″W

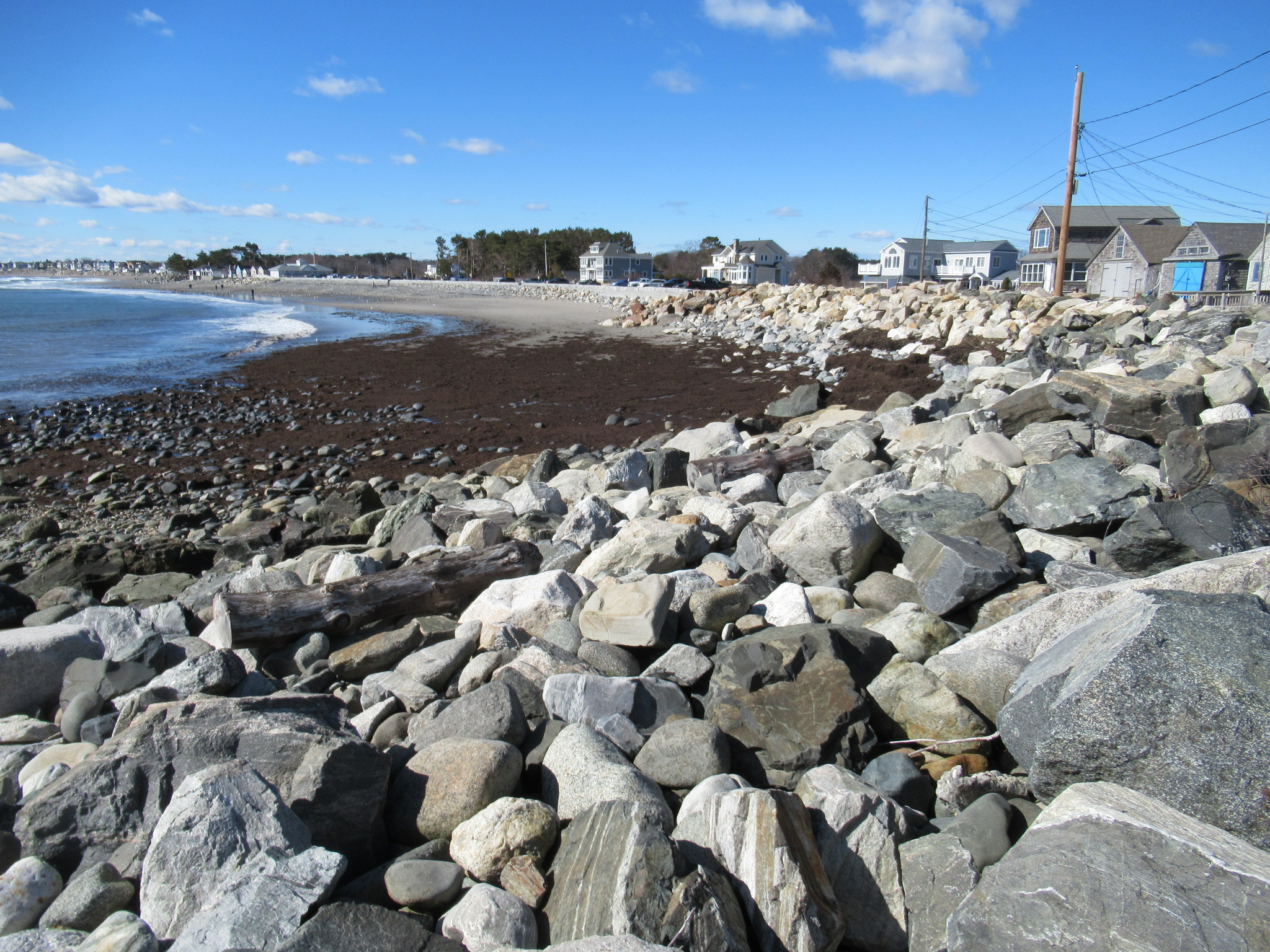
The Atlantic coast at North Hampton, New Hampshire

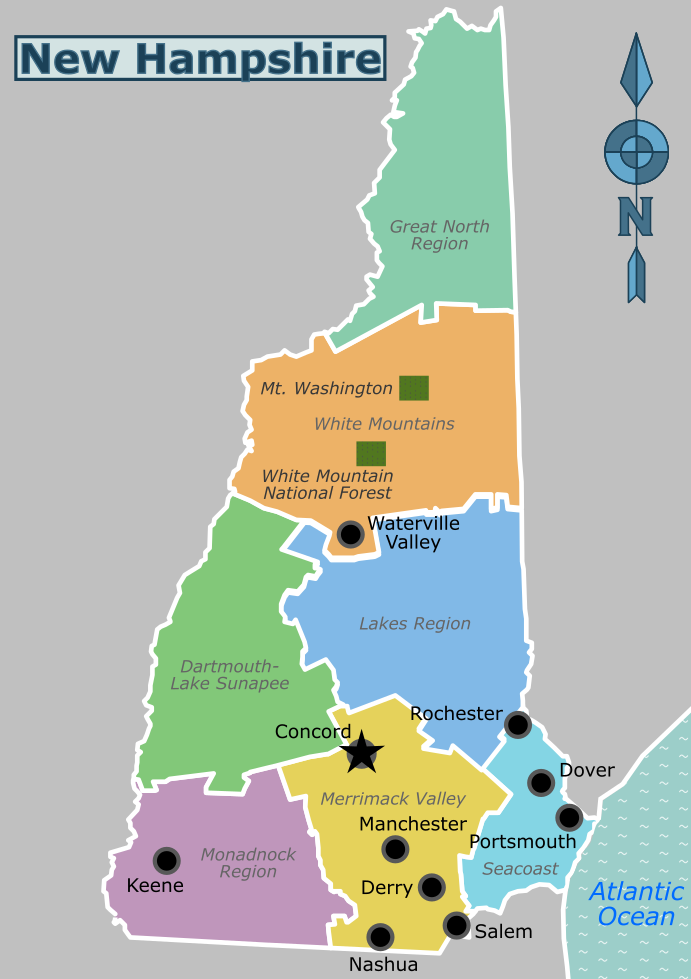
In this 2018 map by the N.H. Department of Transportation, New Hampshire's seacoast region (in lighter blue) lies at the southeastern corner of the state.

The Seacoast Region is the southeast area of the U.S. state of New Hampshire that is centered around the city of Portsmouth. It includes the eastern portion of Rockingham County and the southern portion of Strafford County. At its narrowest definition, the region stretches 13 miles (21 km) along the Atlantic Ocean from New Hampshire's border with Salisbury, Massachusetts, to the Piscataqua River and New Hampshire's border with Kittery, Maine. The shoreline alternates between rocky and rough headlands and areas with sandy beaches. Some of the beaches are bordered by jetties or groins, particularly in the towns of Rye and Hampton. Most definitions of the Seacoast Region includes some inland towns as well, including the Great Bay area cities of Dover and Rochester, the college town of Durham, and areas as far west as Epping. Some definitions also include nearby portions of York County, Maine that are culturally aligned with the Portsmouth area rather than the Portland, Maine metropolitan area.

The city of Portsmouth is the cultural and commercial hub of the region, with numerous historical landmarks and other attractions including Strawbery Banke, the Moffatt-Ladd House, and the John Paul Jones House. Dover in Strafford County is the largest city in the region by population and is the oldest permanent settlement in New Hampshire. Dover is home to the Children's Museum of New Hampshire and the renowned Woodman Institute Museum.

The Seacoast Region was originally inhabited by Algonquian, Pennacook and Iroquoian peoples. Europeans arrived in the early 17th century. Many Seacoast towns were attacked during King William's War in the late seventeenth century, and several houses from that time can still be visited.

Straddling the maritime border New Hampshire shares with Maine are the Isles of Shoals - White, Seavey, Lunging, and Star Islands. From Portsmouth, they are a short ferry ride out into the Gulf of Maine.

== Towns and cities in the region ==
=== Coastal towns and cities (south to north) ===
- Seabrook
- Hampton
- North Hampton
- Rye
- New Castle
- Portsmouth

=== Other towns and cities ===
- Atkinson
- Barrington
- Brentwood
- Danville
- Dover
- Durham
- East Kingston
- Epping
- Exeter
- Fremont
- Greenland
- Hampstead
- Hampton Falls
- Kensington
- Kingston
- Lee
- Madbury
- Newfields
- Newington
- Newmarket
- Newton
- Plaistow
- Rochester
- Rollinsford
- Sandown
- Somersworth
- South Hampton
- Stratham

=== Maine communities sometimes included in the region ===
- Berwick
- Eliot
- Kittery
- Lebanon
- North Berwick
- Ogunquit
- Sanford
- South Berwick
- Wells
- York

== Tourist attractions in the region ==
- The Children's Museum of New Hampshire in Dover
- Great Bay estuary, with several access sites
- Hampton Beach
- The Music Hall in Portsmouth; the state's oldest theater
- Odiorne Point State Park and the associated Seacoast Science Center
- Prescott Park, waterfront park with flower gardens, water fountains and summer plays and concerts
- Star Island, seasonal conference center and hotel located 7 miles (11 km) out to sea
- The Strawbery Banke outdoor history museum of Portsmouth
- The USS Albacore, a museum ship in Portsmouth
- Water Country, New England's largest water park
- The Wentworth by the Sea, a grand old hotel previously fallen into disrepair but now completely renovated
- The Whittemore Center, a multi-purpose arena in Durham, and home to University of New Hampshire ice hockey teams, as well as various concerts and events
- The Woodman Institute Museum in Dover
- Auto racing
  - Lee USA Speedway in Lee
  - New England Dragway in Epping
  - Star Speedway in Epping

== Transportation ==
New Hampshire Route 1A runs along the ocean shore, while U.S. Route 1 runs in a parallel direction slightly farther inland. During the high tourist season, these highways are crowded with day tourists and seasonal renters. Slightly farther inland, Interstate 95 (the Blue Star Turnpike) carries most of the through traffic between Maine and Massachusetts, while NH Route 101 carries New Hampshire's east–west traffic between the Seacoast Region and the inland portions of the state. The Spaulding Turnpike (NH 16) originates in Portsmouth and travels north through Dover and Rochester, connecting the Seacoast with New Hampshire's Lakes Region and White Mountains Region.

Amtrak's Downeaster stops in three Seacoast communities - Dover, Durham–UNH, and Exeter- with service to Boston's North Station and Portland, and points north. The Downeaster also stops in nearby Wells, Maine.

The Pease International Tradeport includes a shipping port (the Port of New Hampshire) and the Portsmouth International Airport at Pease, which provides cargo and passenger service.
