= Sarah Mildred Long Bridge =

Bridge between Portsmouth, New Hampshire, and Kittery, Maine

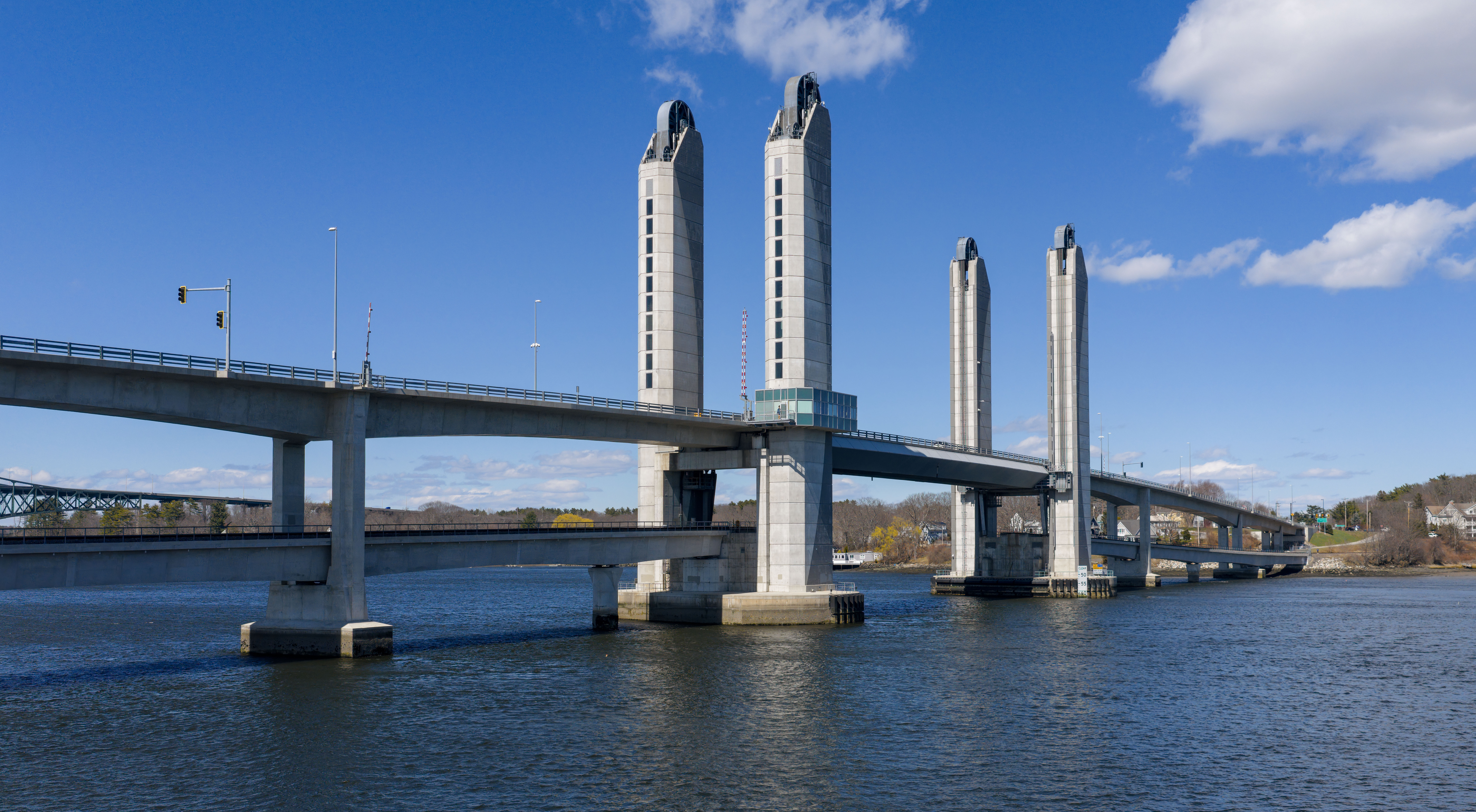
- The current bridge, as seen from the Portsmouth, New Hampshire, side
- Coordinates: 43°05′12″N 70°45′40″W
- Carries: US 1 Byp.
- Crosses: Piscataqua River
- Locale: Portsmouth, NH, and Kittery, ME
- Official name: Sarah Mildred Long Bridge
- Owner: NHDOT & MaineDOT
- Maintained by: Maine-New Hampshire Interstate Bridge Authority

Characteristics
- Design: Concrete lift bridge
- Total length: 2,800 feet (850 m)
- Longest span: 300 feet (91 m)
- No. of lanes: Two

Rail characteristics
- No. of tracks: One
- Track gauge: Standard

History
- Designer: Hardesty & Hanover
- Engineering design by: Figg Engineering
- Constructed by: Cianbro Corp.
- Opened: March 30, 2018

Location
- Interactive map of Sarah Mildred Long Bridge

The Sarah Mildred Long Bridge is a lift bridge spanning the Piscataqua River between Portsmouth, New Hampshire, and Kittery, Maine, carrying traffic of U.S. Route 1 Bypass. An original bridge by the same name was in operation from 1940 until 2016. A replacement span opened in March 2018.

== History ==
The original Sarah Mildred Long Bridge was the third span to carry motor vehicle traffic between Maine and New Hampshire at Portsmouth, replacing a river crossing at its location dating from 1822. The bridge was the direct result of the work of the Maine-New Hampshire Interstate Bridge Authority, which had been formed in 1937. The major goal of the bridge project was to relieve congestion in downtown Portsmouth and Kittery, where U.S. Route 1 crossed the river via the Memorial Bridge, which had opened in 1923. The bridge was completed in 1940, a decade and a half before the United States embarked on construction of an ambitious Interstate Highway System.

Original bridge
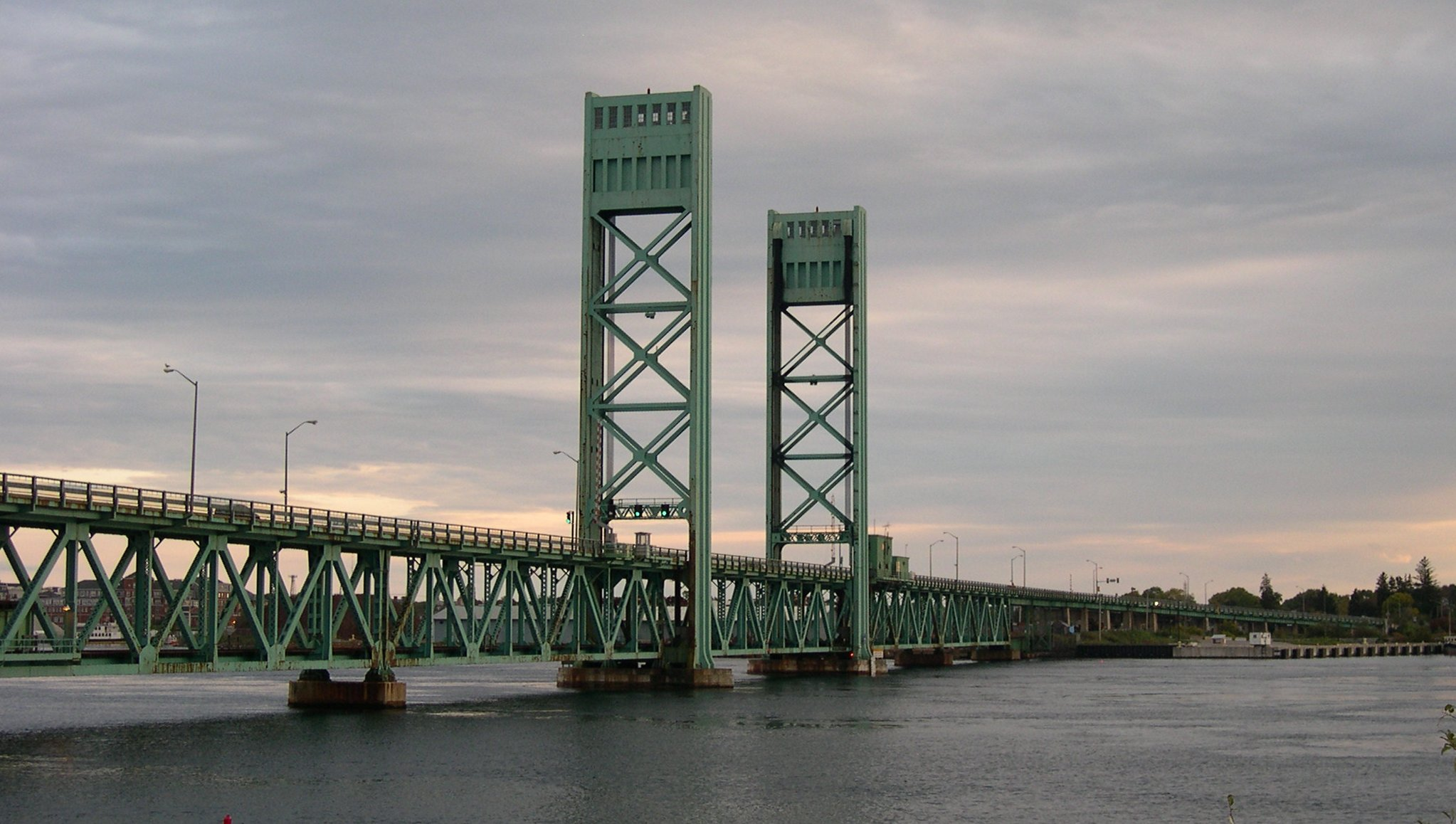
- The original Sarah Mildred Long Bridge, as seen from Kittery, Maine
- Coordinates: 43.0859°N 70.76091°W
- Carries: US 1 Byp.
- Crosses: Piscataqua River
- Locale: Portsmouth, NH, and Kittery, ME
- Official name: Sarah Mildred Long Bridge
- Maintained by: Maine-New Hampshire Interstate Bridge Authority
- ID number: 021702510010800

Characteristics
- Design: Steel truss lift bridge
- Total length: 854.7 m (2,804 ft)
- Width: 9.1 m (29.9 ft)
- Clearance above: 5.09 m (16.7 ft)
- Clearance below: 41 m (134.5 ft) (Lift span open)

History
- Opened: November 8, 1940
- Closed: August 24, 2016

Statistics
- Daily traffic: 14,000 (2014); 14,900 (1990)

Location
- Interactive map of Original bridge

The original Sarah Mildred Long Bridge was a double-deck truss bridge, with a road deck above and a railroad bed below. Upon its dedication in 1940 the structure was simply known as the Maine-New Hampshire Bridge, later the Maine-New Hampshire (Interstate) Bridge. It was renamed in 1987 to honor Sarah Mildred Long, a 50-year employee of the Maine-New Hampshire Interstate Bridge Authority who rose from a secretary at its creation in 1937 to executive director.

The bridge featured two separate movable spans, the central auto-bearing main lift and a retractable bridge for rail traffic near the Kittery shore. When not in use, the rail span lifted up and retracted south atop its own tracks inside the trusswork. The main span lifted on an as-needed basis for ocean-going commercial traffic, and on a varying set schedule for recreational craft unable to pass beneath the rail span, which was left in an open position by default to accommodate small boats and minimize interruption of auto traffic caused by raising the lift.

From 1960 until 1972, the U.S. Route 1 Bypass filled a gap in Interstate 95, linking traffic traveling the otherwise unconnected New Hampshire Turnpike and Maine Turnpike. Although most of the bypass is four lanes wide, the bridge had only a three-lane roadbed, with traffic on the center lane originally switching direction depending on load. This, combined with being a drawbridge, placed the bridge far below Interstate Highway standards. The turnpikes, and I-95, did not directly connect until the opening of the "high level" Piscataqua River Bridge and the extensions of I-95 leading to it in the early 1970s. In the decades leading to the bridge's closure, vehicular traffic had been reduced to just two lanes.

On October 12, 1989, a worker was killed when he was riding on a counterweight as the bridge closed and he was crushed against the bridge's superstructure.

On April 1, 2013, a large tanker struck the bridge, causing severe structural damage and leading to a temporary closure of vehicular traffic. As the original Memorial Bridge had been closed in October 2011 and its replacement was under construction, the Piscataqua River Bridge was the only bridge between Kittery and Portsmouth remaining open. The bridge was repaired and re-opened to vehicle traffic on May 13, 2013.

On August 21, 2016, the bridge became stuck in the closed position due to a mechanical failure after a shift in one of its trunnions caused a sheave and thrust block in the south tower to jam. On August 22, officials managed to partially raise the main span to allow shipping to pass under, which is given priority by federal law over road traffic. It was deemed unsafe to resume regular lifting, and with NHDOT and MaineDOT officials determining repairs would cost $1 million and take at least six weeks (and permanent closure just four weeks after the earliest possible re-opening), a decision was made to leave the span partially open until demolition. The premature closure of the bridge was announced on August 24, 2016.

Major demolition began with the overnight removal of the center span on October 14, 2016. Removal of the bridge's towers followed, with a goal of removing both towers by November 18, 2016, completed in April 2017.

=== Railroad ===
The railroad track that ran across the bridge was originally part of the Boston & Maine Railroad, which connected to South Berwick, Maine, via an easement that is now Maine Route 236. In addition to replacing a vehicular span, the bridge absorbed the traffic of a railroad trestle located just upriver which had collapsed on September 10, 1939. It had been weakened when a caisson used in the construction of the new bridge dragged its anchor cables, which pulled out several of the trestle's bents, sending B&M engine No. 3666 and a baggage car to the bottom of the river, where they remain.

The tracks led to Kittery Junction, at which point one route split off towards York, Maine, on the York Harbor and Beach Railroad, while the other fork led to the Portsmouth Naval Shipyard in Kittery. The York Harbor and Beach branch was abandoned in 1925, leaving only the shipyard branch still in service. That branch is primarily used for the transportation of nuclear materials.

=== Present bridge ===
Construction of a $158.5 million replacement bridge began in January 2015, originally scheduled to open to traffic in September 2017. The original bridge had been set to close in November 2016, but was moved up to August 21, 2016, by a mechanical problem that would have cost $1 million to repair.

The new structure was designed by a joint venture of Hardesty & Hanover and Figg Engineering and constructed by Cianbro Corp. Rather than being constructed of structural steel, the bridge employs cantilevered, post-tensioned concrete spans, allowing 11 fewer piers than the original and an improved ability to absorb ship impact. Its vertical clearance of 56 feet (17 m) when closed to "IC-standard" is approximately 35 feet (11 m) higher than the original bridge, allowing an estimated 68% fewer openings. The bridge deck also has wider shoulders for bicycle lanes.

An award of $25 million was made by the U.S. Department of Transportation for the railroad portion of the work, reflecting its role in supporting the Portsmouth Naval Shipyard downriver. The result was a dual-purpose single 300-foot (91 m) lift span with an integrated set of rails, which lowers to railroad level when rail traffic must cross.

The new bridge was scheduled to open on September 1, 2017, but construction delays pushed this back into 2018. Maine and New Hampshire's DOT officials maintain the bridge was "commissioned" in late January 2018 following several simulated lifting scenarios, allowing the states to take possession. The replacement bridge was officially opened on March 30, 2018.

In March 2019, the project was recognized as New Hampshire's most outstanding engineering achievement of the prior year by the American Council of Engineering Companies (ACEC). The project was also one of 16 finalists for ACEC's national award.

==== Incidents ====
On April 30, 2025, a person died by suicide by jumping from the bridge. That the person had jumped was not known until surveillance video of the bridge was reviewed the next day. On October 27, 2025, a man from Eliot, Maine, was rescued shortly after 10 a.m. after jumping from the bridge.

== Gallery ==
=== Original bridge ===
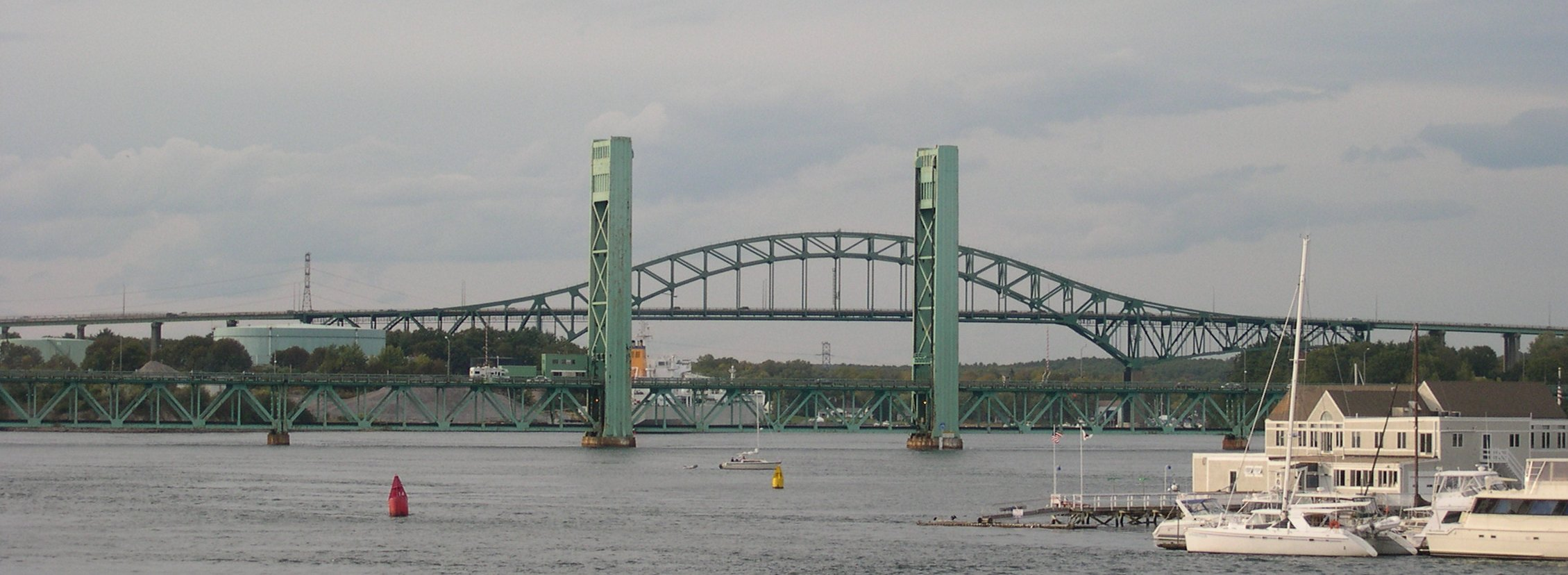
Seen from the Memorial Bridge, Piscataqua River Bridge behind

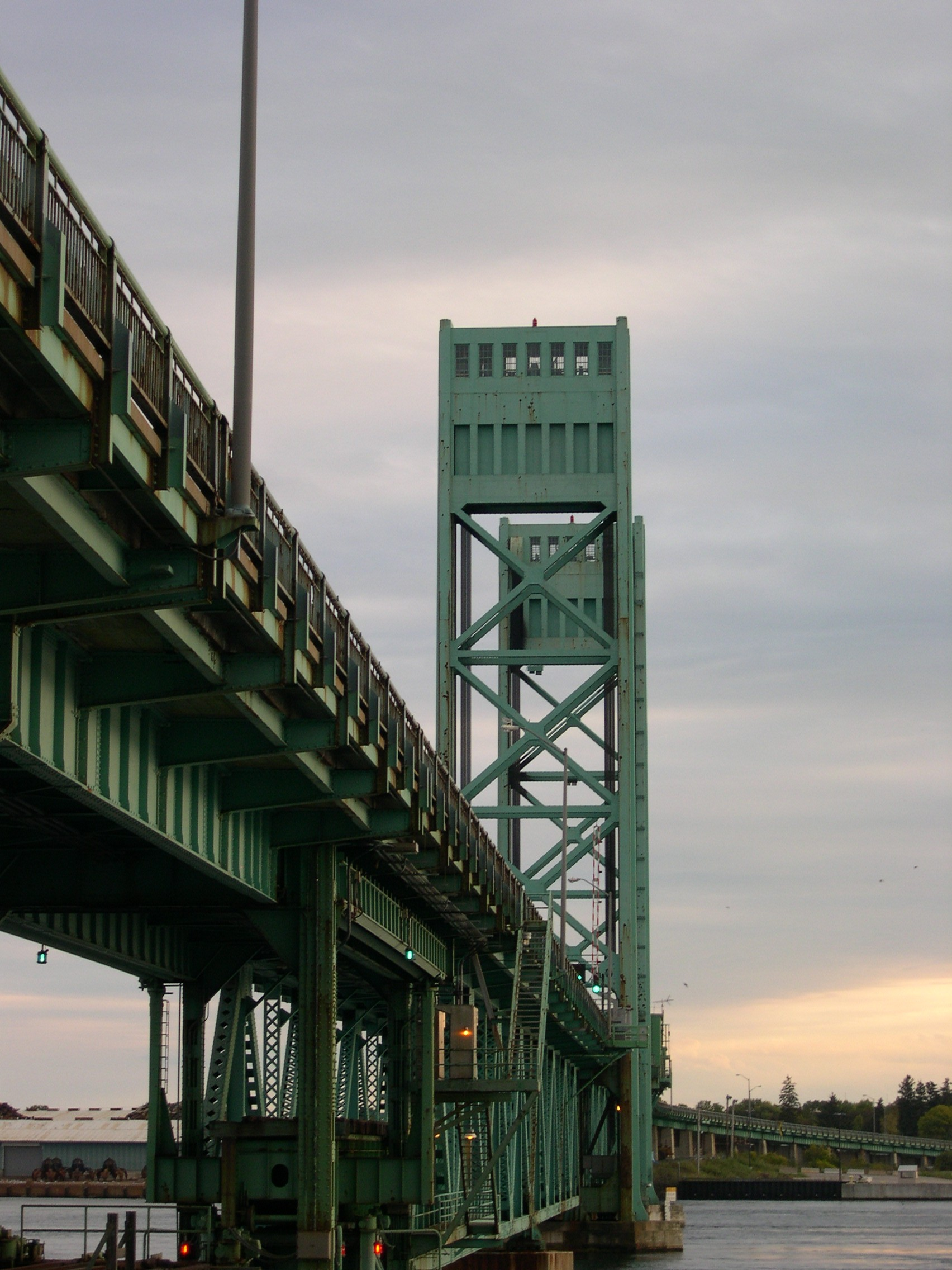
Movable rail bed

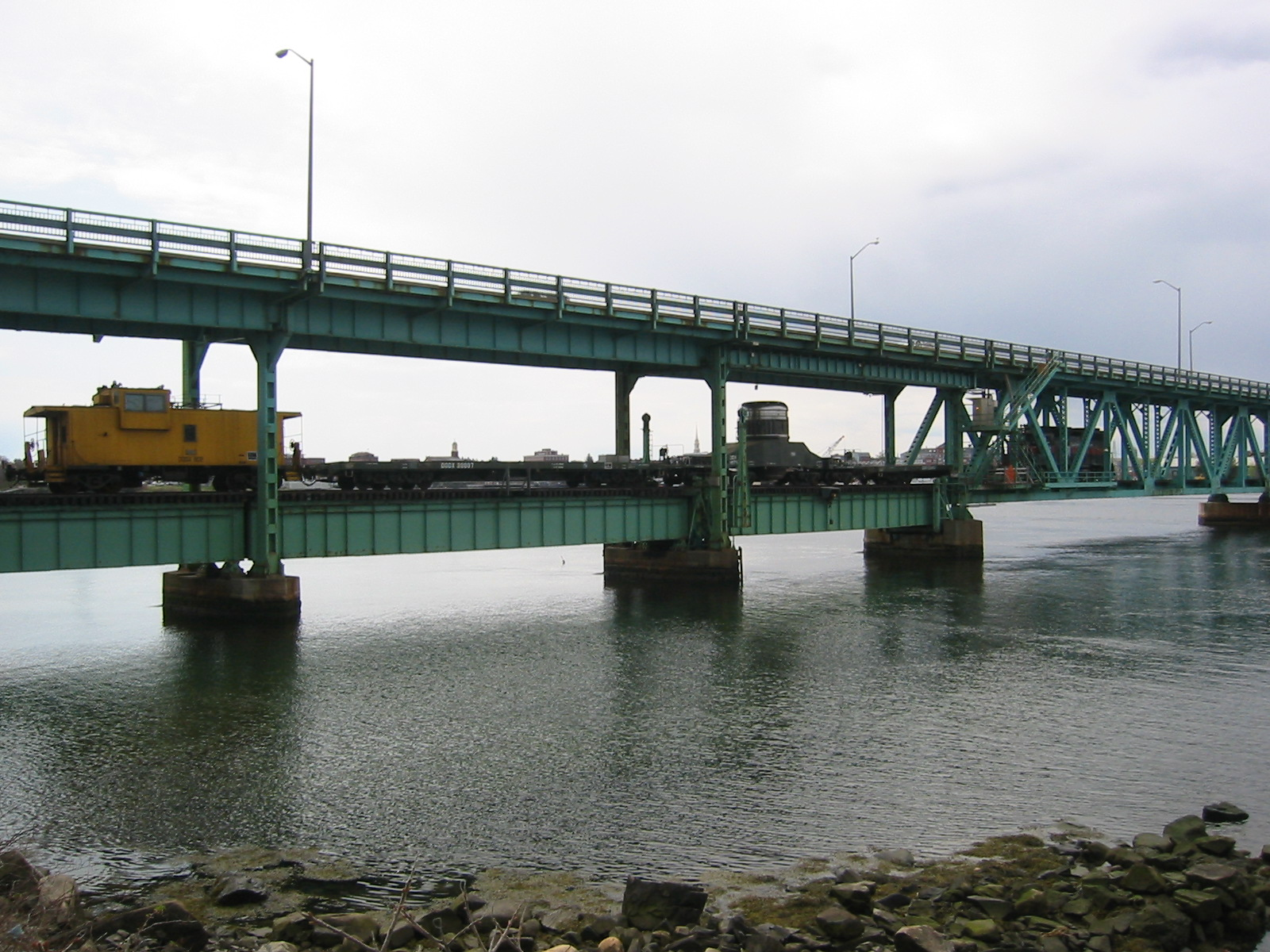
Nuclear fuel transport train leaving Kittery

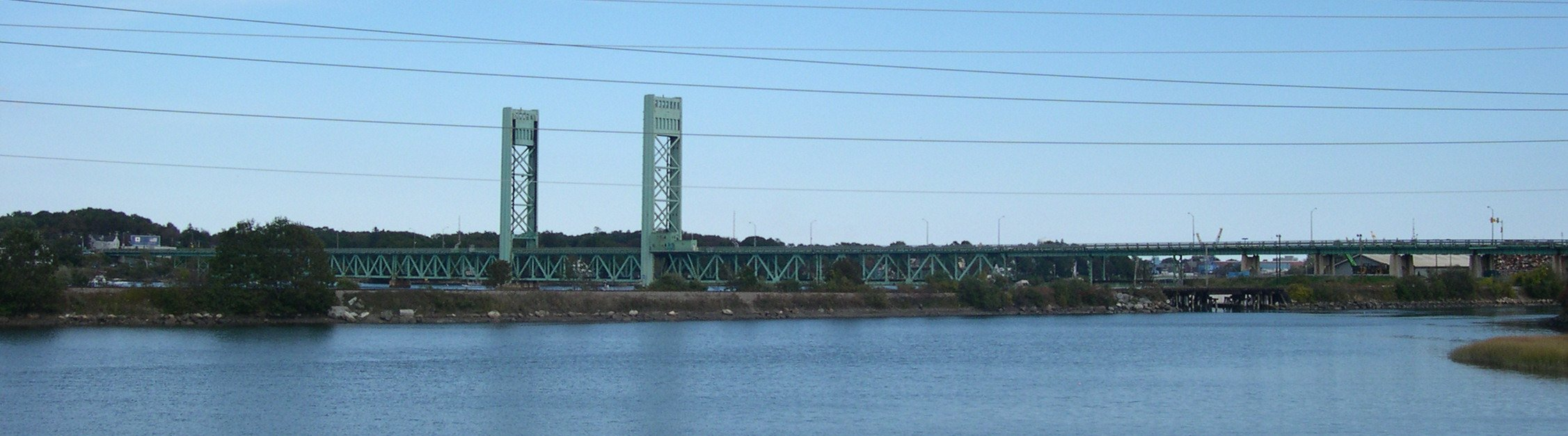
Seen from Portsmouth

=== Present bridge ===
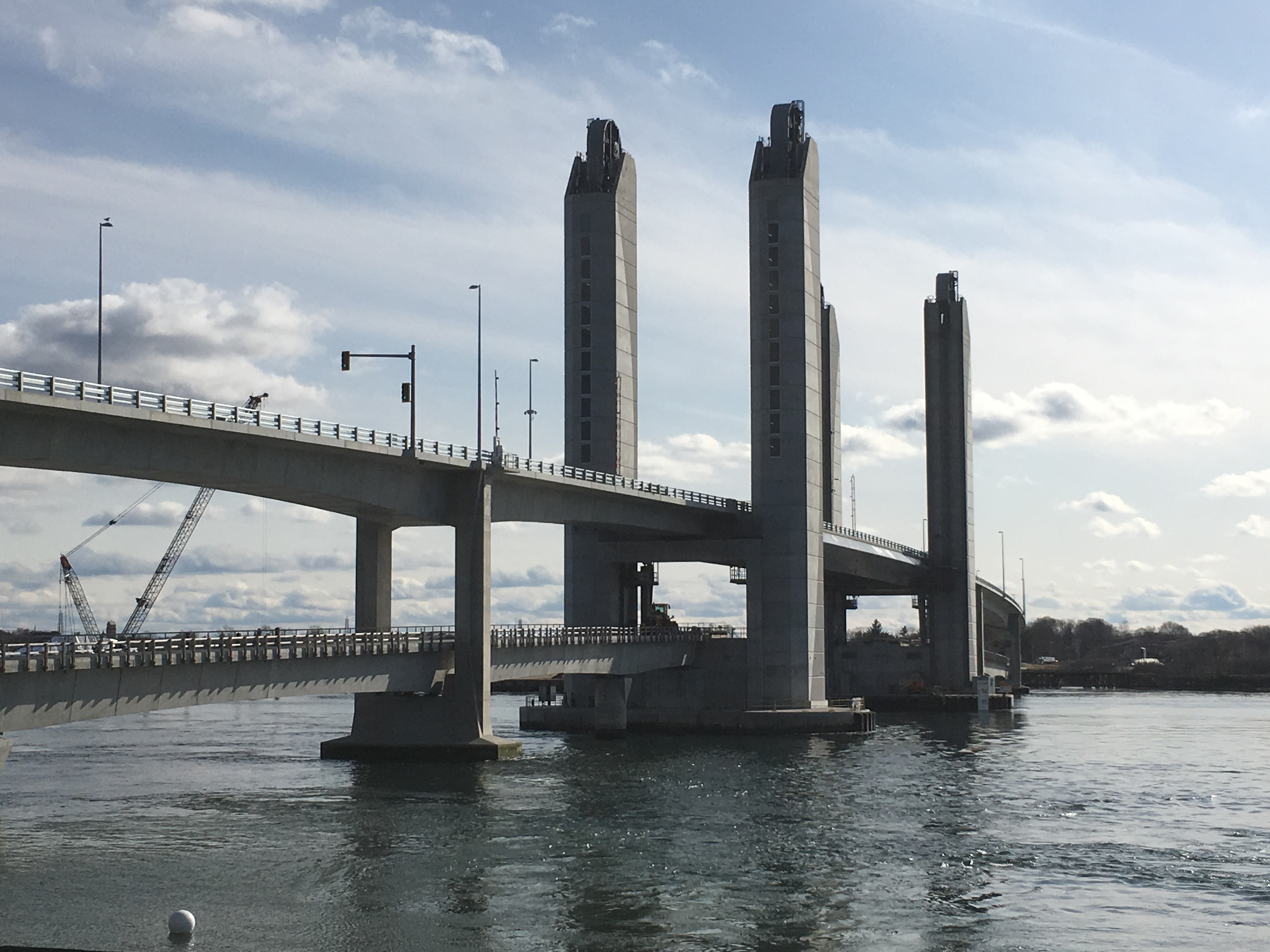
Seen from the Maine side

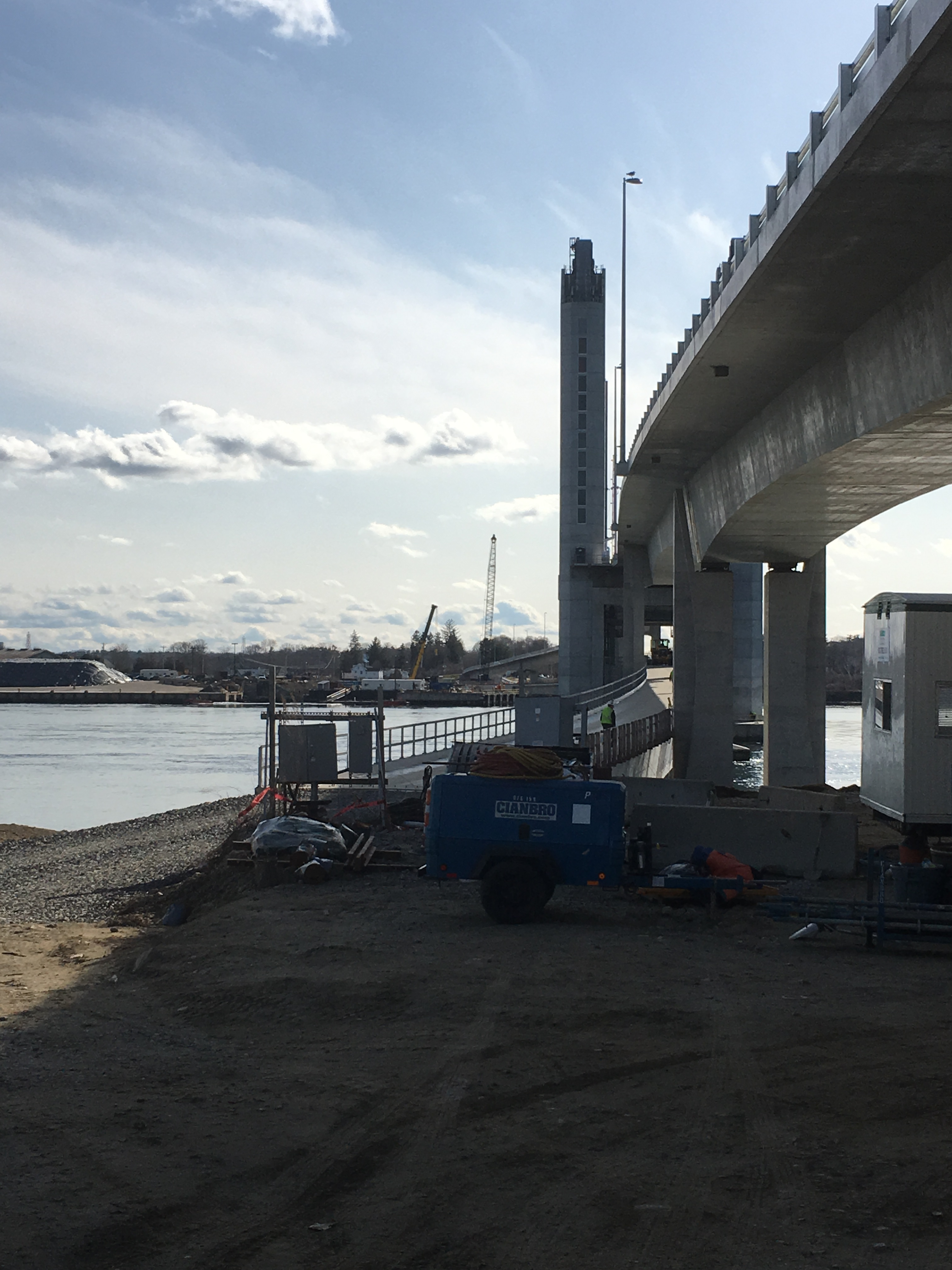
Incomplete rail bed as of April 2018

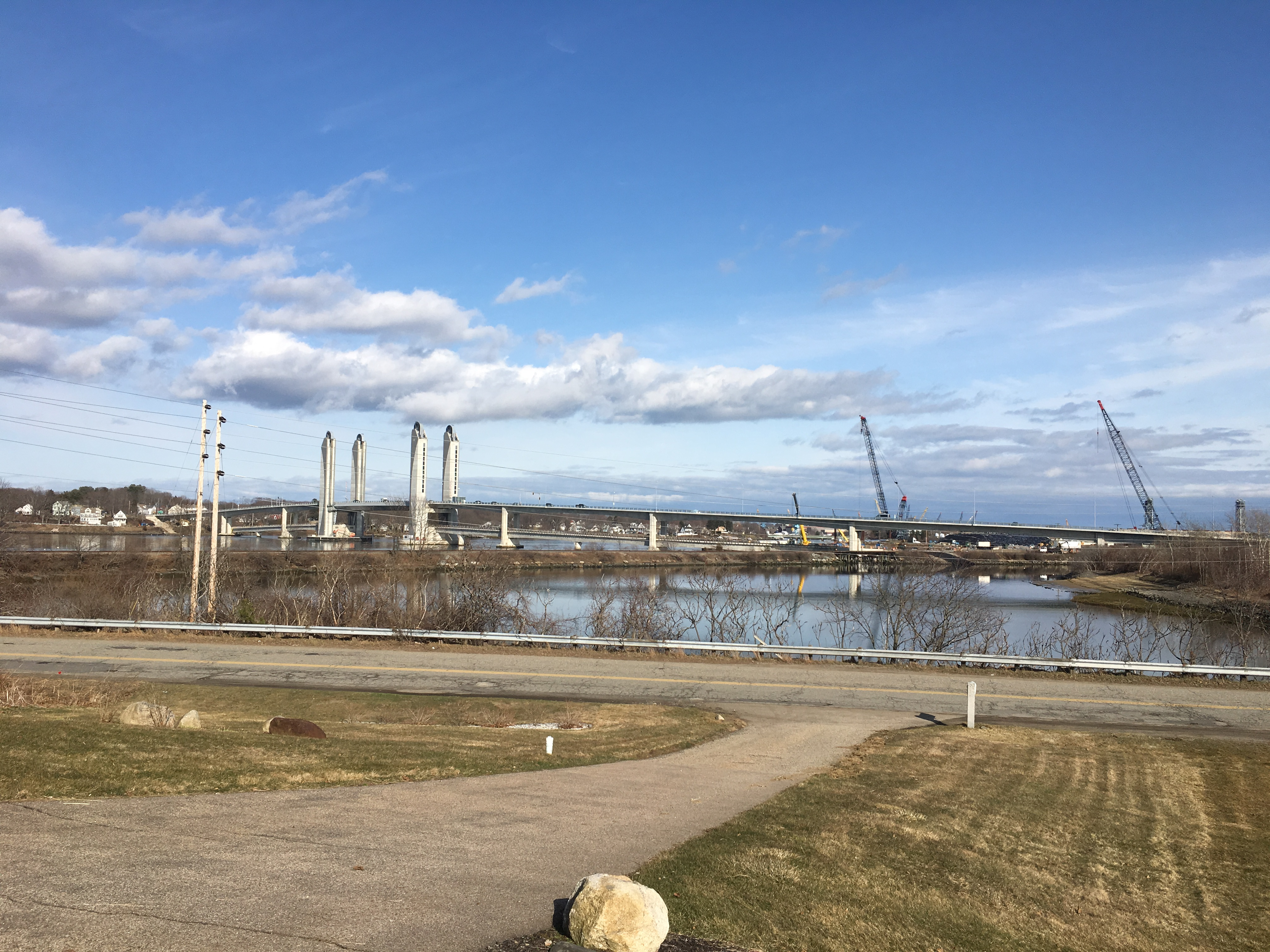
Bridge and ramps, from the New Hampshire side

== See also ==
- List of bridges documented by the Historic American Engineering Record in New Hampshire
