= Route 286 (Massachusetts–New Hampshire) =

Highway in Massachusetts and New Hampshire

Route 286
- Route 286 highlighted in red

Route information
- Maintained by MassDOT and NHDOT
- Length: 3.7 mi (6.0 km): Massachusetts: 1.40 mi (2.25km); New Hampshire: 2.356 mi (3.792 km)

Major junctions
- West end: I-95 in Salisbury, MA
- US 1 in Salisbury, MA
- East end: NH 1A in Seabrook, NH

Location
- Country: United States
- States: Massachusetts, New Hampshire
- Counties: MA: Essex, NH: Rockingham

Highway system
- Massachusetts State Highway System; Interstate; US; State
- New Hampshire Highway System; Interstate; US; State; Turnpikes
← Route 240	Route 286	→ I-290
← NH 236	NH 286	→ I-293
← I-86	Route 86	→ Route 88
← NH 85	NH 86	→ NH 87

Route 286 is a 3.7-mile-long (6.0 km) east–west state highway in Salisbury, Massachusetts and Seabrook, New Hampshire. The route was previously known as Route 86 and was renumbered to avoid a numerical conflict with the designation of a freeway as Interstate 86 in the 1970s. Route 286 is the highest numbered New Hampshire state highway.

== Route description ==
The western terminus of Route 286 is Interstate 95 in Salisbury, Massachusetts, where it is accessed via exit 90 (old exit 60) on I-95. Traffic coming from I-95 uses Toll Road, while traffic going to I-95 uses Main Street. The divergence resolves at Pike Street, where Route 286 proceeds eastward, crossing U.S. Route 1 where it becomes Collins Street. After crossing into Seabrook, New Hampshire, Collins Street and Route 286 diverge at an intersection with South Main Street. Route 286 then continues to its eastern terminus with New Hampshire Route 1A (Ocean Boulevard), which runs north–south along the Atlantic shore, approximately 160 feet (49 m) north of the Massachusetts/New Hampshire state line.

The total length of Route 286 is approximately 3.75 miles (6.04 km), of which approximately 2.35 miles (3.78 km) are in New Hampshire and approximately 1.4 miles (2.3 km) are in Massachusetts.

== History ==
Route 286 was formerly numbered 86 and renumbered to make room for I-86, which is now designated as part of I-84.

Route 286 was previously designated as Route 86 in both Massachusetts and New Hampshire.

Between 1971 and 1984, Massachusetts had an Interstate 86, which ran from Sturbridge, Massachusetts, to Hartford, Connecticut. The construction of I-86 prompted Massachusetts Route 86 to be renumbered to "286" because, according to Massachusetts Highway Department (MassHighway) protocol, a state highway and an Interstate Highway may not share the same number. (The only exception to this rule is Massachusetts Route 295 and I-295, which are on opposite ends of the state.) When Massachusetts renumbered Route 86 to 286, New Hampshire matched the change on its section.

In 1984, plans to connect I-84 along the present day I-384/US 6 corridor from Hartford to Providence were scuttled for environmental reasons. As a result, I-84 was rerouted onto the completed I-86 freeway. The existing section of the old I-84 became I-384. The Massachusetts State Route has kept the 286 number, and by extension the New Hampshire road has as well.

Today, I-86 is the former Southern Tier Expressway/NY Route 17 in New York State as that road is upgraded to Interstate Highway standards. Modern I-86 is unrelated to the I-86 that existed in Massachusetts.

== Major intersections ==
State	County	Location	mi	km	Destinations	Notes
Massachusetts	Essex	Salisbury	0.0	0.0	I-95 to I-495 south – Peabody, Boston, Portsmouth, NH, Portland, ME	Western terminus of Route 286; exit 90 on I-95
Massachusetts	Essex	Salisbury	1.0	1.6	US 1 – Salisbury, Newburyport, Seabrook, NH, Hampton, NH	
Massachusetts–New Hampshire state line			1.4 0.000	2.3 0.000	Route transition	
New Hampshire	Rockingham	Seabrook	2.356	3.792	NH 1A to Route 1A south – Seabrook Beach, Hampton Beach, Salisbury, MA	Eastern terminus of NH 286
1.000 mi = 1.609 km; 1.000 km = 0.621 mi: Route transition
