= Interstate 95 in New Hampshire =

Interstate Highway in New Hampshire, United States

Interstate 95
- Blue Star Turnpike
- I-95 highlighted in red

Route information
- Maintained by NHDOT Bureau of Turnpikes
- Length: 16.131 mi (25.960 km)
- Existed: 1957–present
- History: Turnpike opened in 1950
- NHS: Entire route

Major junctions
- South end: I-95 at the Massachusetts state line in Seabrook
- NH 101 in Hampton; US 4 / NH 16 / Spaulding Turnpike / US 1 Byp. in Portsmouth
- North end: I-95 / Maine Turnpike at the Maine state line in Portsmouth

Location
- Country: United States
- State: New Hampshire
- Counties: Rockingham

Highway system
- Interstate Highway System; Main; Auxiliary; Suffixed; Business; Future; New Hampshire Highway System; Interstate; US; State; Turnpikes
← I-93	→ NH 97

Interstate 95 (I-95) is an Interstate Highway on the east coast of the United States, connecting Florida with Maine. Within the state of New Hampshire, it serves the Seacoast Region and is a toll road named the Blue Star Turnpike or New Hampshire Turnpike. The sixteen-mile (26 km) turnpike is maintained by the New Hampshire Department of Transportation (NHDOT) Bureau of Turnpikes and has a single toll plaza near Hampton.

The Blue Star Turnpike begins near the Massachusetts state line in the town of Seabrook and travels north through Hampton and its neighboring municipalities. It then continues around Portsmouth and crosses the Piscataqua River Bridge at the Maine state line, where it becomes the Maine Turnpike. New Hampshire's portion of I-95 is the shortest of any state that the Interstate passes through; the highway is the main thoroughfare between urban areas in Massachusetts and points in Maine.

Construction of the turnpike was approved in 1947 and began a year later in an effort to bypass congestion on U.S. Route 1 (US 1), the main seacoast highway. It opened to traffic on June 24, 1950, and was later designated as part of I-95 in 1957. The northernmost section in Portsmouth, connecting to the Maine Turnpike, was left incomplete until the Piscataqua River Bridge opened in 1972.

== Route description ==
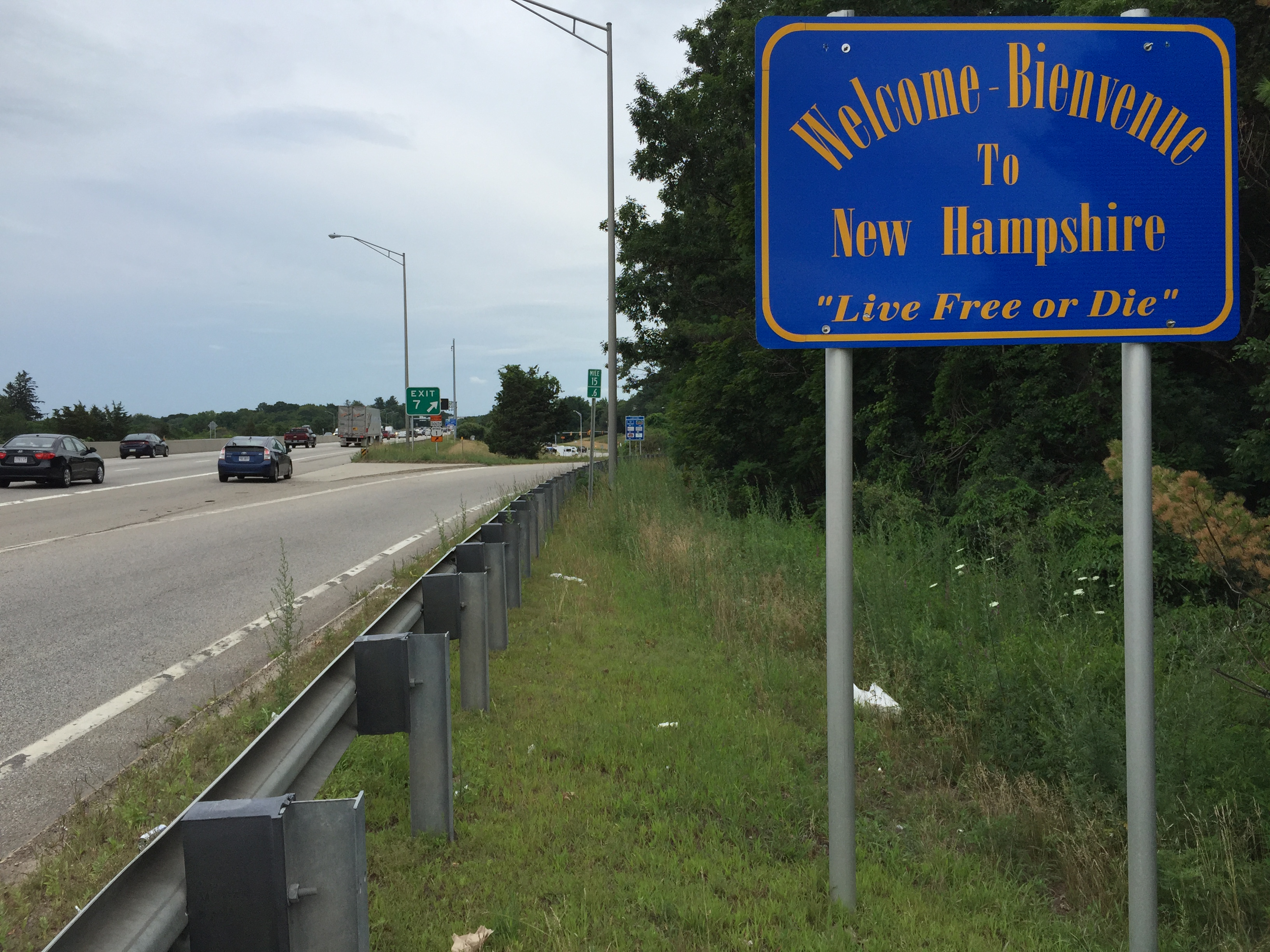
View south along I-95 just after crossing the Piscataqua River Bridge from Maine

I-95 crosses into New Hampshire in the town of Seabrook, north of Salisbury, Massachusetts. The crossing includes a pair of welcome centers for the respective states and a southbound ramp serving a connector to Massachusetts Route 286. The highway then intersects New Hampshire Route 107 (NH 107), which serves Seabrook and the Seabrook Nuclear Power Plant, at exit 1.

The freeway continues as a toll road, named the Blue Star Turnpike and commonly known as the New Hampshire Turnpike, and parallels U.S. Route 1 (US 1) through the inland areas of southeastern New Hampshire's Seacoast Region. In Hampton Falls, I-95 crosses over NH 84 and NH 88 without connecting interchanges; it then serves a pair of state-run liquor stores operated by the New Hampshire Liquor Commission. The northbound Hampton outlet is considered the state's flagship store, with annual sales of $33.5 million, and largely serves out-of-state customers.

The turnpike passes through the town of Hampton, where it crosses under NH 27 and reaches its sole toll plaza at exit 2. The exit includes an interchange with NH 101, which provides connections from the turnpike to Exeter and Manchester. I-95 then continues northeast through the towns of North Hampton and Greenland and crosses over several highways before reaching its next interchange. The turnpike enters the city of Portsmouth and intersects NH 33 near the city's international airport. After passing Portsmouth Regional Hospital, I-95 intersects the Spaulding Turnpike (US 4/NH 16) and U.S. Route 1 Bypass (US 1 Byp.) via ramps to the Portsmouth Circle. The freeway travels through the residential neighborhoods of western Portsmouth and intersects Market Street before crossing over the Piscataqua River Bridge into Maine, where it becomes the Maine Turnpike.

The New Hampshire section of the highway is 16 miles (26 km) long, the shortest of any state on I-95, which traverses the entire U.S. East Coast from Florida to Maine. It is entirely located within Rockingham County and is generally eight lanes wide. The New Hampshire Department of Transportation, which maintains the highway through its Bureau of Turnpikes, measures traffic volumes at various points that are expressed in terms of annual average daily traffic. Traffic volumes on I-95 within the state in 2015 ranged from a minimum of 63,000 vehicles southwest of Portsmouth to a maximum of 98,000 vehicles near the Spaulding Turnpike. The corridor is also served by several private intercity bus operators and public transit systems, including the Cooperative Alliance for Seacoast Transportation. During the summer months, the highway peaks at 125,000 daily vehicles and becomes routinely congested as weekend vacationers from the Greater Boston area travel to destinations in New Hampshire and Maine.

== History ==
=== Predecessors ===
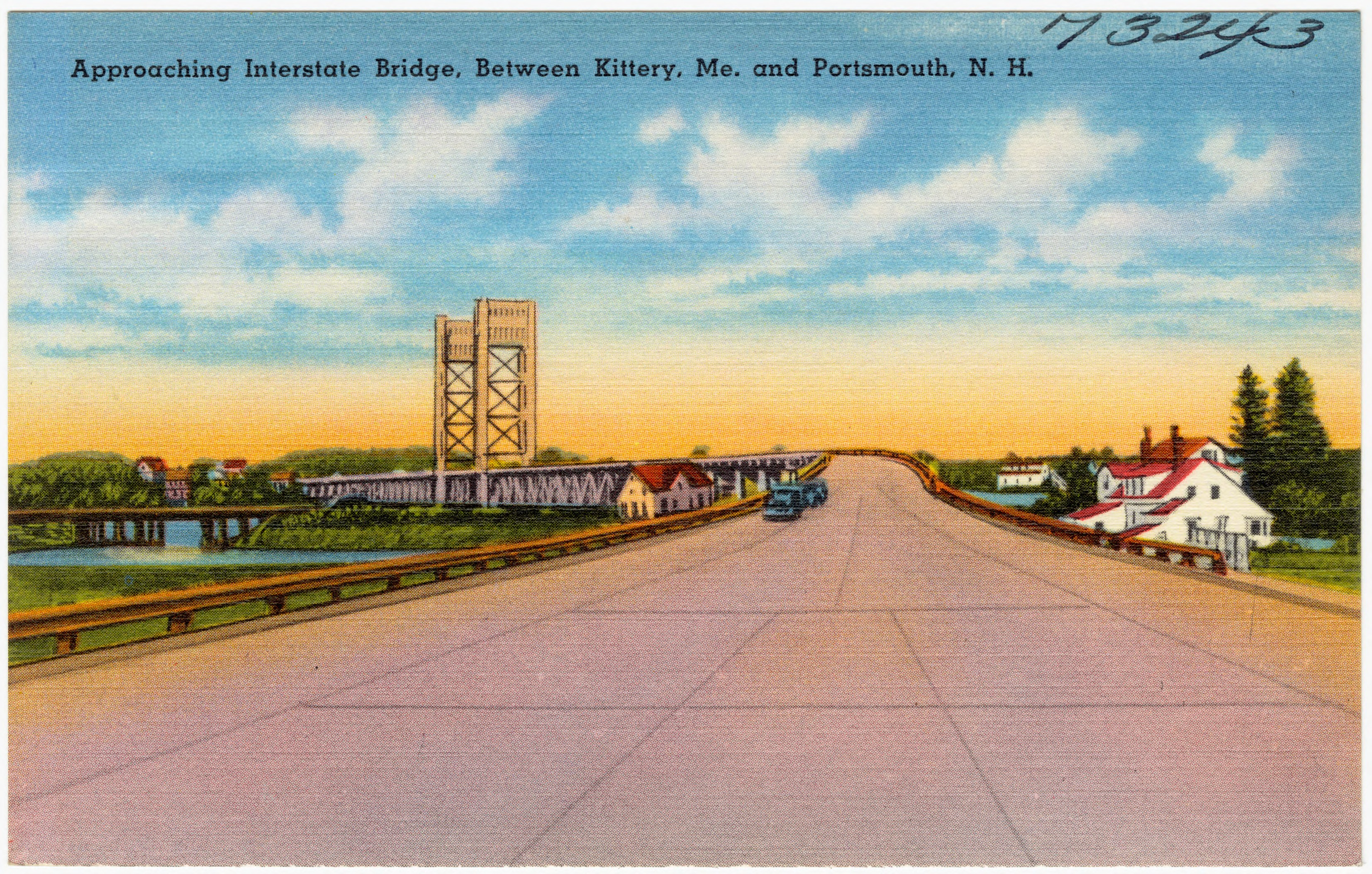
Postcard view of the original Sarah Mildred Long Bridge, opened in 1940

The earliest roads traversing New Hampshire's Seacoast were constructed in the 17th century to connect Hampton to the Massachusetts Colony. They were later upgraded in the 18th century for stagecoach service and replaced by a toll road named "The Turnpike" that operated from 1810 to 1826. The toll road was purchased by the towns of Hampton and Hampton Falls in 1826 and renamed "Lafayette Road" for the Marquis de Lafayette in 1830. These roads were later acquired by the state government to form a modern highway system for automobiles and were incorporated into a single highway, which was assigned the designation of NH 1 in 1909.

NH 1 was succeeded by US 1 in 1926, which was established as part of a national numbered highway system. The highway was paved from 1929 to 1931 and later upgraded with traffic signals to handle increased use. Heavy congestion on US 1, particularly tourists from Massachusetts traveling to destinations in New Hampshire and Maine, led to proposals in the 1930s for a bypass that would connect with a new bridge over the Piscataqua River near Portsmouth. The US 1 Bypass was opened in 1940 as a divided highway with grade separation and traveled around Portsmouth, connecting to Maine via a new lift bridge. The highway and bridge cost $3 million to construct (equivalent to $52.4 million in 2024) and were partially funded by the federal government as a New Deal project.

=== Turnpike construction ===
A modern turnpike through the Seacoast Region was proposed in the early 1940s as part of a New England regional network that would connect with the Maine Turnpike, which had been announced in 1941 and opened in 1947. Several seacoast towns voiced their opposition, due to fears that traffic would bypass New Hampshire's beaches, and instead favored widening US 1. The state legislature established the New Hampshire Turnpike Authority in 1947 to oversee construction of a 15-mile (24 km) turnpike with four lanes and a limited number of exits. It would be funded with a $7.5 million (equivalent to $82.5 million in 2024) bond issue that would be retired by 1977.

The state government formally approved the construction of the turnpike in February 1948, setting up a tollway commission to purchase and condemn land for right-of-way. Among the affected landowners was then-Governor Charles M. Dale, who opted to donate part of his North Hampton farm instead of accepting a payment from the state government. A $5.25 million (equivalent to $54.6 million in 2024) bid from a Connecticut-based construction firm was accepted in October 1948 and construction on the turnpike began the following month. Early construction was slowed by a temporary injunction requested by the New Hampshire Gas and Electric Company to allow for the relocation of utility poles in the highway's right-of-way.

State highway engineer Daniel Dickenson resigned from his position in August 1949, following an investigation ordered by governor Sherman Adams into the awarding of a design contract for the turnpike project. Dickenson received payments from a former business associate, Charles Morse, who was an associate with the engineering firm that designed portions of the tollway for an inflated price. Morse was fired from his position later that month by Frank Merrill, the new state highway commissioner and former U.S. Army general. Amid the investigations, the state legislature approved an additional $280,000 in contingency funds (equivalent to $2.92 million in 2024) that would also be used to expand an interchange on the existing US 1 Bypass.

Major work on the toll road's main elements, including 14 overpasses, three bridges, and an 800-foot (240 m) traffic circle in Portsmouth, was mostly completed by December 1949. The turnpike would comprise four lanes on a macadam asphalt surface with granite curbs, 11-foot (3.4 m) shoulders, and a 24-foot (7.3 m) grass median. The project also included a provisional interchange near Hampton to connect with a future expressway serving Exeter (now NH 101). An additional spur route connecting the south end of the highway to US 1 in Salisbury, Massachusetts, was constructed by the Massachusetts Department of Public Works.

The Blue Star Turnpike was dedicated on June 24, 1950, by Governor Adams and local officials in a ceremony attended by 5,000 people. It was immediately opened to traffic for a day of toll-free use and carried 12,416 vehicles on its first day. The initial toll was 10 to 15 cents for automobiles (equivalent to $1.34 to $2.01 in 2025) and 20 to 50 cents for trucks (equivalent to $2.68 to $6.69 in 2025), and the speed limit was set at 60 miles per hour (97 km/h). The turnpike had no services and was monitored by state police and highway workers, offering free vehicle towing and tire changes. It cost $7.4 million to construct (equivalent to $76.3 million in 2024), resulting in a $400,000 surplus (equivalent to $4.12 million in 2024) that was returned to the state government by the turnpike authority. Business owners in seacoast towns along US 1 reported major losses in sales following the turnpike's opening as 60 percent of traffic bypassed various towns. Traffic on US 1 later recovered to its original volume by the end of 1951.

=== Connections and extension ===
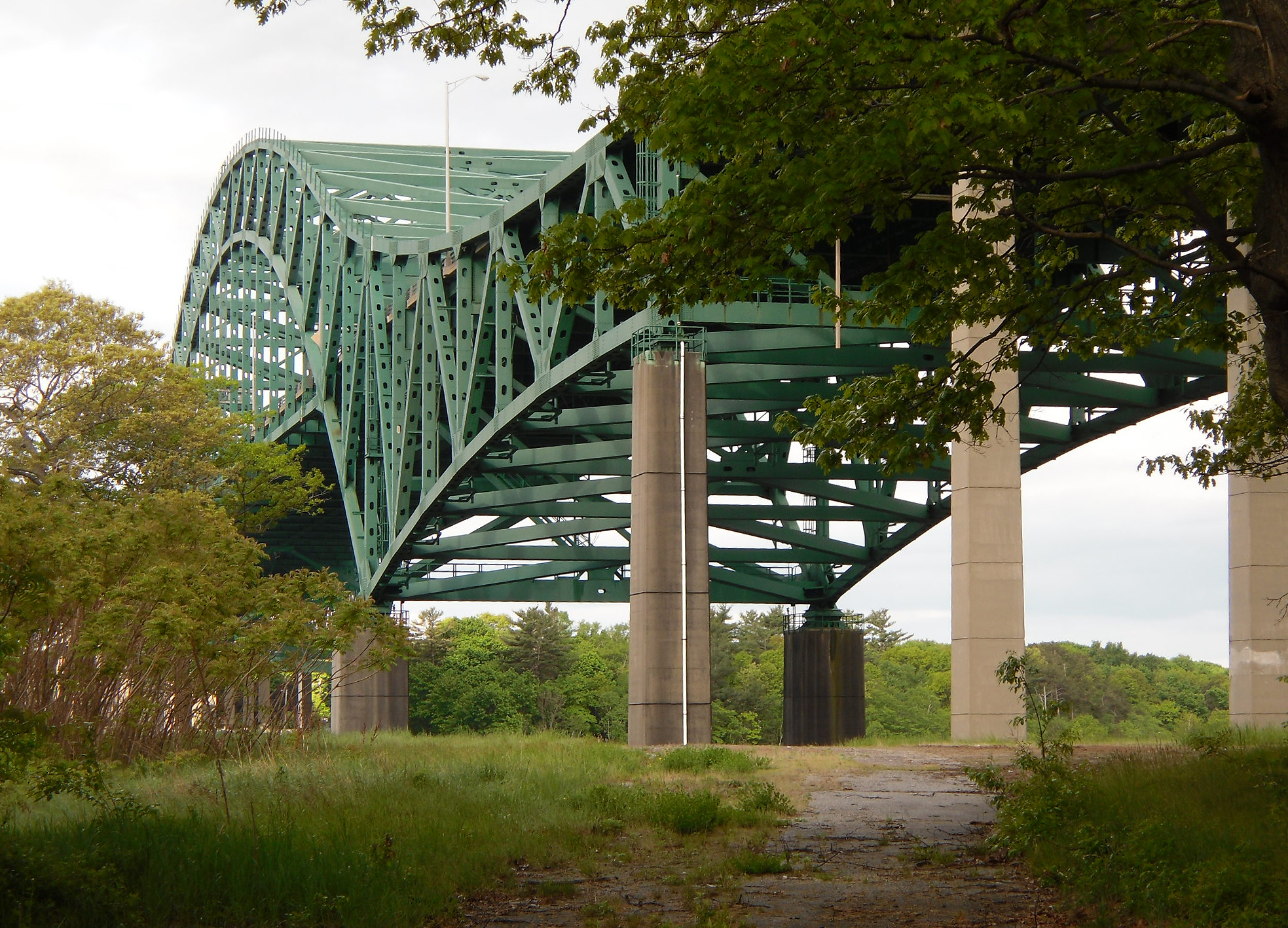
The Piscataqua River Bridge, which carries six lanes of I-95 between New Hampshire and Maine, opened in 1972

The Blue Star Turnpike was one of several toll roads grandfathered into the Interstate Highway System and designated as part of I-95 in 1957. The designation also included the Maine Turnpike to the north as well as a new freeway bypassing US 1 in northeastern Massachusetts that opened in September 1954 and connected Boston to the Blue Star Turnpike near Seabrook. The northern end at the Portsmouth Traffic Circle had an indirect connection to the Maine Turnpike, but was modified to include ramps to the new Spaulding Turnpike when it opened in August 1957. The Hampton interchange was expanded in 1963 to connect with the Exeter–Hampton Expressway (now part of NH 101).

The US 1 Bypass, which bridged the disconnected sections of I-95 between the north end of the turnpike and the south end of the Maine Turnpike in Kittery, was an expressway with partial grade separation that did not meet Interstate Highway standards. Its crossing over the Piscataqua River, the Maine–New Hampshire Interstate Bridge, was also a movable lift bridge that caused delays for motorists, especially during busy holiday weekends. A high-level, six-lane bridge over the Piscataqua River, connecting with extensions of I-95 through Portsmouth and Kittery, was proposed in the early 1960s to complete the missing link in the freeway. A competing plan to twin the existing Maine–New Hampshire Interstate Bridge was submitted by the Maine government, but was determined to be more costly due to land required for its approaches, which were already occupied by buildings.

Following a four-year debate, the New Hampshire state legislature approved designs for the high-level bridge in early 1965 despite some opposition from Portsmouth residents. A concurrent bill had been passed by Maine in 1963 but rejected by New Hampshire. Construction of the Piscataqua River Bridge began in February 1968 and cost $50 million (equivalent to $284 million in 2024). It opened on November 1, 1972, completing the missing 5-mile (8.0 km) link between the sections of I-95 in New Hampshire and Maine. The project also included an expanded interchange with the Spaulding Turnpike, allowing traffic to bypass the Portsmouth Traffic Circle, and a new interchange at Market Street in an area marked for urban renewal. On June 24, 1970, four construction workers on the bridge fell to their deaths when a platform gave way on the Maine approach.

=== Later history ===
Traffic volumes on the turnpike grew to an average of over 12,700 vehicles per day by 1962, prompting state officials to propose an expansion. Plans for the new Piscataqua River Bridge had already included a wider approach, while the south end at the Massachusetts state line was rebuilt as an eight-lane highway in 1968. A 1969 report to the state legislature recommended the addition of four lanes to the existing turnpike and reconstruction of the Hampton toll plaza at a cost of $3 million (equivalent to $19.6 million in 2024).

The widening of the New Hampshire Turnpike to eight lanes began in early 1973 and required the acquisition of 271 properties and the rebuilding of several bridges. During construction, several major holiday backups—some as long as 14 miles (23 km)—plagued the turnpike. The Hampton toll plaza was relocated north and expanded in February 1977, coinciding with the completion of the widening project. Toll collection was temporarily suspended from 1979 until 1981 to encourage motorists to switch from the congested NH 101. The New Hampshire Liquor Commission opened its southbound Hampton store on the turnpike in 1981, which was followed by the northbound outlet in 1992.

Another expansion of the Hampton toll plaza was completed in May 1991 and was followed by the addition of a reversible lane at the toll plaza in July 1995. Further expansions were completed in 1997 and 2002. The turnpike has been used for several tolling experiments by NHDOT, including automatic tolling from 1995 to 1996 and one-way tolling from 2003 to 2004. The Hampton toll plaza was expanded again in June 2010 with the opening of open road tolling lanes that could read E-ZPass transponders. It was the first facility in New England to support open road tolling. The existing tollbooths at the plaza were demolished to make way for the lanes and relocated tollbooths. The project cost $17.8 million to construct (equivalent to $24.9 million in 2024) and implement and resulted in 50 percent of users during the Memorial Day weekend test period using the open road tolling lanes.

== Tolls ==
The Blue Star Turnpike is the shortest of three toll roads maintained by the NHDOT Bureau of Turnpikes. The Hampton toll plaza at exit 2 is the sole toll collection point on the turnpike and is the largest facility of its kind in New Hampshire. Its main plaza has six booths and two open road lanes in each direction for vehicles with E-ZPass transponders. The interchange also includes an auxiliary toll plaza, named the Hampton Side Toll Plaza, for traffic traveling to and from NH 101 with four lanes in each direction—two reserved for E-ZPass use and two with cash booths.

As of 2020, two-axle vehicles using the turnpike are charged $2 in cash fare or $1.40 with an E-ZPass at the main Hampton toll plaza. Two-axle vehicles using the side toll plaza connected to NH 101 are charged $0.75 in cash or $0.53 with an E-ZPass. Traffic using other sections of the turnpike that exclude exit 2 are not required to pay a toll. In fiscal year 2019, a total of 41.6 million transactions were made at the Blue Star Turnpike's toll plazas, generating $67.6 million in revenue.

== Exit list ==
Exit numbers are sequential. The entire route is in Rockingham County.

Location	mi	km	Exit	Destinations	Notes
New Hampshire–Massachusetts line	0.000	0.000	–	I-95 south – Boston	Continuation into Massachusetts
New Hampshire–Massachusetts line	0.000	0.000	90	Route 286 east – Beaches, Salisbury, MA, Massachusetts Visitor Center	Signed based on Massachusetts numbering; southbound exit originates in New Hampshire; western terminus of Route 286
Seabrook	0.662	1.065	1	NH 107 – Seabrook, Kingston	Last northbound exit before toll
Hampton	5.465	8.795	2	NH 101 – Exeter, Hampton, Hampton Beach, Manchester, Concord	Hampton Side Toll Plaza
Hampton	5.777	9.297	Hampton Main Toll Plaza		
Portsmouth	12.451	20.038	3B	NH 33 – Greenland, Portsmouth	Signed as exit 3 northbound; last southbound exit before toll
Portsmouth	13.225	21.284	3A	Pease International Tradeport, Park & Ride, Bus Terminal	Southbound exit only
Portsmouth	13.329	21.451	4	US 4 west / NH 16 north / Spaulding Turnpike north – New Hampshire Lakes, White Mountains, University of New Hampshire, Newington, Dover	Northbound exit and southbound entrance; eastern terminus of US 4; southern terminus of NH 16
Portsmouth	13.836	22.267	5	US 1 Byp. (Portsmouth Circle)	Northbound signage
Portsmouth	14.462	23.274	5	US 4 west / NH 16 north / Spaulding Turnpike north – Newington, Dover, Durham, Concord	Southbound signage; eastern terminus of US 4; southern terminus of NH 16
Portsmouth	14.565	23.440	6	Woodbury Avenue – Portsmouth	Northbound exit only
Portsmouth	15.421	24.818	7	Market Street / Woodbury Avenue – Downtown Portsmouth	Woodbury Avenue not signed northbound
Piscataqua River	16.131	25.960	–	I-95 north / Maine Turnpike north – All Maine Points	Continuation into Maine
1.000 mi = 1.609 km; 1.000 km = 0.621 mi: Incomplete access; Tolled

Interstate 95
Previous state: Massachusetts	New Hampshire	Next state: Maine
