= New Hampshire Route 1A =

State highway in New Hampshire, US

New Hampshire Route 1A
- Map of Rockingham County in southeastern New Hampshire with NH 1A highlighted in red

Route information
- Maintained by NHDOT
- Length: 18.405 mi (29.620 km)

Major junctions
- South end: Route 1A in Salisbury, MA
- NH 101 in Hampton
- North end: US 1 in Portsmouth

Location
- Country: United States
- State: New Hampshire
- Counties: Rockingham

Highway system
- New Hampshire Highway System; Interstate; US; State; Turnpikes
← US 1	→ NH 1B

New Hampshire Route 1A is an 18.32-mile (29.48 km) long state highway located in southeast New Hampshire. The route runs along the Atlantic coastline from the Massachusetts border north to Rye, then turns toward downtown Portsmouth. The southern terminus is at the Massachusetts state line in Seabrook where it continues south as Massachusetts Route 1A. The northern terminus is at a junction with U.S. Route 1 in downtown Portsmouth. For the length of the road's run along the shore, its local name is Ocean Boulevard. In the northern part of Rye, it is known as Pioneer Road, and in Portsmouth, it is known as Miller Avenue and Sagamore Avenue.

== Route description ==
Older-style NH 1A shield, still prominent on signs.

NH 1A begins at the state border between Seabrook and Salisbury, Massachusetts. Just 50 yards (46 m) from the state line, NH 1A meets the eastern end of NH 286, an extension of Massachusetts Route 286, a connector to US 1 and Interstate 95 in Salisbury. NH 1A proceeds north, passing east of Hampton Harbor into Hampton Beach. It is on Hampton Beach where NH 101 meets its eastern end at NH 1A as a single-lane alleyway in each direction (Church Street northbound, Highland Avenue southbound). NH 1A continues as a four-lane divided highway running directly next to the coastline beaches. Just north of an intersection with Winnacunnet Road, NH 1A narrows back to a two-lane undivided highway, and then meets the eastern end of NH 27. The road continues another mile or so, crossing into North Hampton, and meets the eastern end of NH 111. NH 1A proceeds north out of North Hampton and along the coastline past Rye Beach, Rye North Beach, Wallis Sands, and Odiorne Point State Park, where it turns west, away from the ocean. The road turns back north at the intersection known as Foyes Corner and enters the Portsmouth city limits, passing the southern end of NH 1B (a connector to New Castle). NH 1A continues towards downtown Portsmouth, where it ends at the intersection of Miller Avenue and Middle Street (US 1).

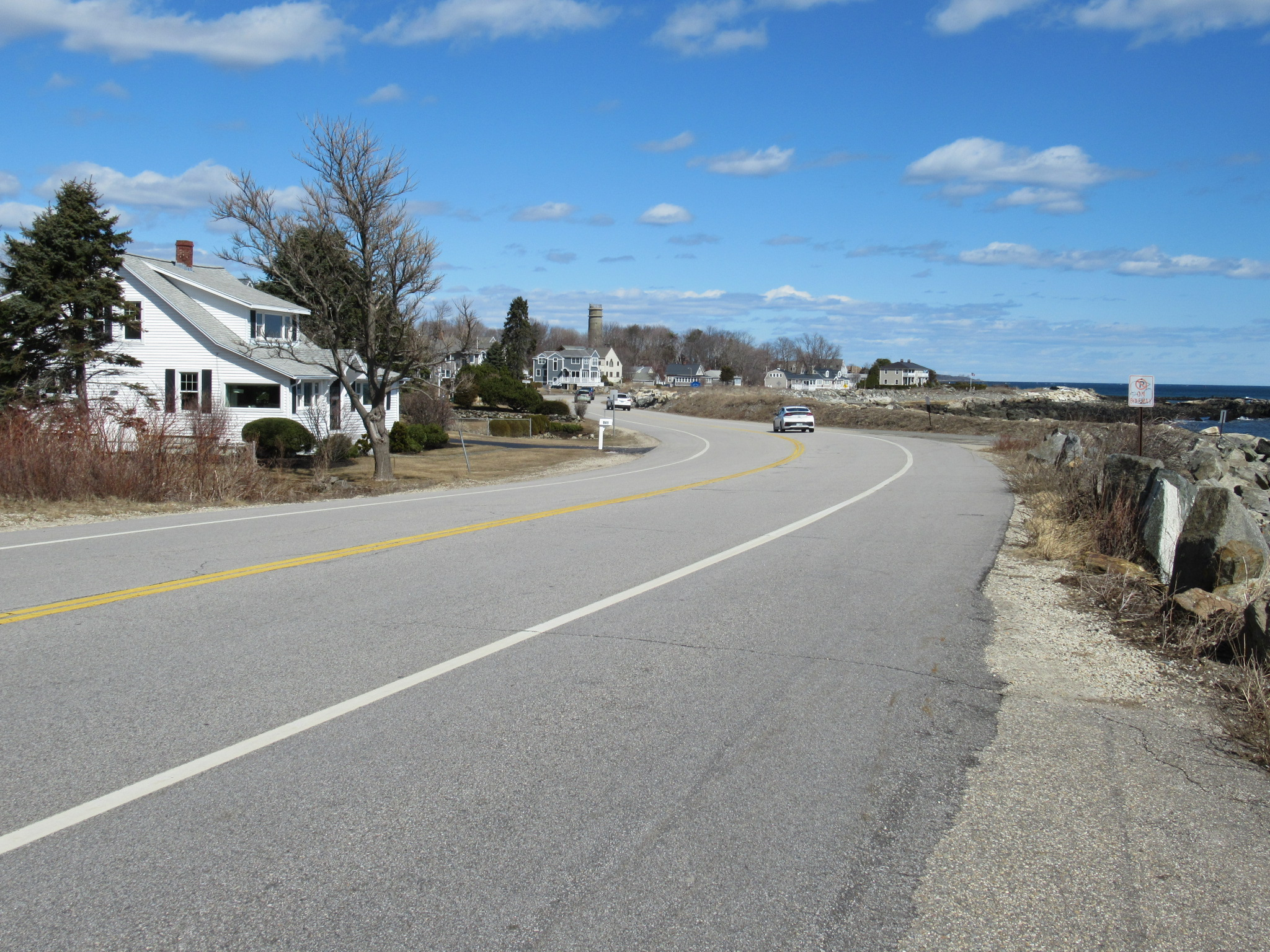
NH 1A in Rye, New Hampshire

== Major intersections ==
The entire route is in Rockingham County.

Location	mi	km	Destinations	Notes
Seabrook	0.000	0.000	Route 1A south (North End Blvd.) – Salisbury	Continuation into Massachusetts
Seabrook	0.032	0.051	NH 286 west to US 1 / I-95 – Seabrook, Boston	Eastern terminus of NH 286
Hampton	2.965– 3.164	4.772– 5.092	NH 101 west (Church Street) to US 1 / I-95 – Exeter, Manchester	Eastern terminus of NH 101
Hampton	4.152– 4.171	6.682– 6.713	NH 101E west (Winnacunnet Road)	Eastern terminus of NH 101E
Hampton	5.210	8.385	NH 27 west (High Street) – Exeter	Eastern terminus of NH 27
North Hampton	6.870	11.056	NH 111 west (Atlantic Avenue) – North Hampton, Exeter	Eastern terminus of NH 111
Portsmouth	16.880	27.166	NH 1B north (Wentworth Road)	Southern terminus of NH 1B
Portsmouth	18.405	29.620	US 1 (Middle Street)	Northern terminus
1.000 mi = 1.609 km; 1.000 km = 0.621 mi

== Road names along route ==
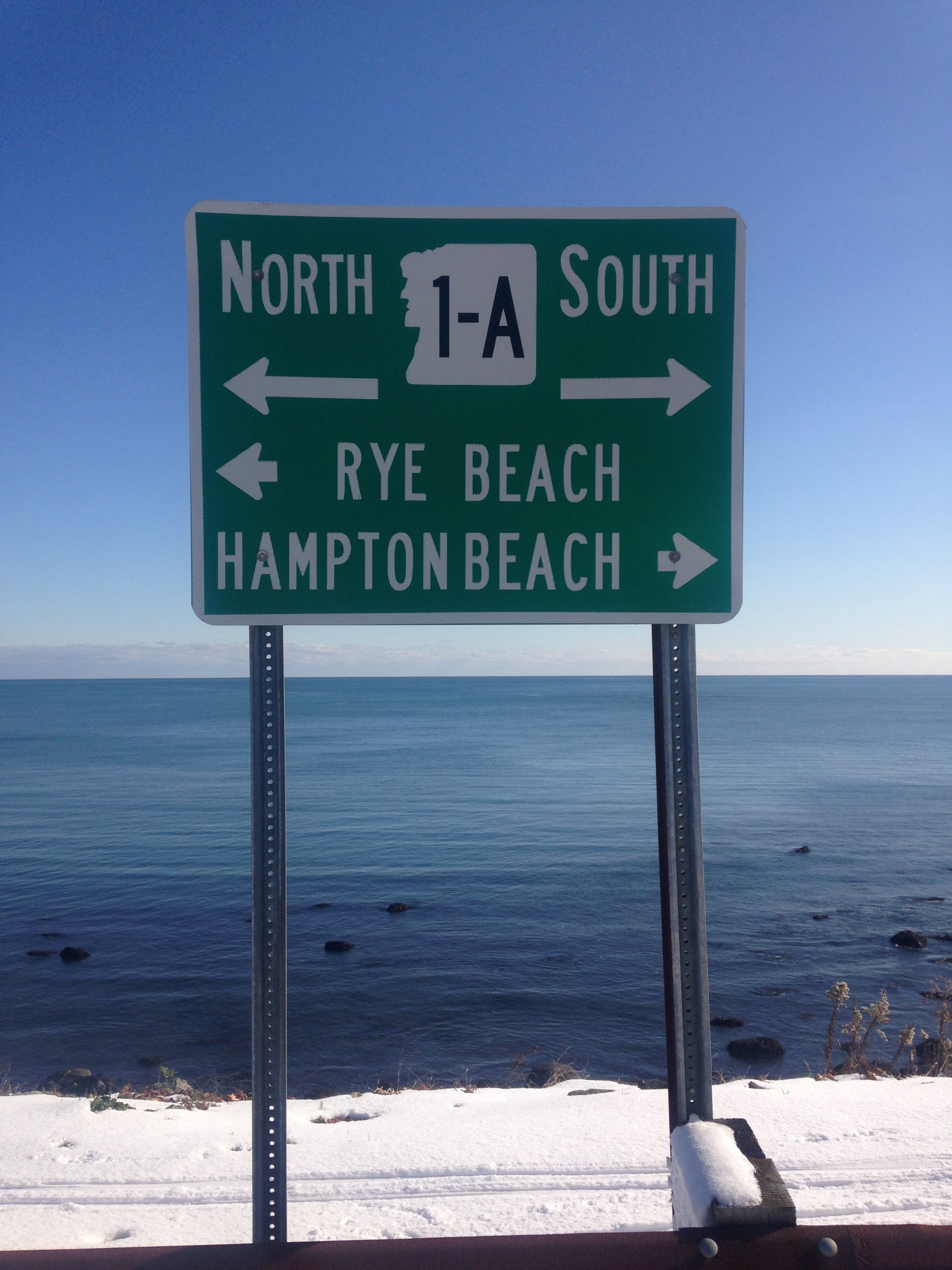
1-A sign along Ocean Boulevard in North Hampton, New Hampshire

NH 1A is known by the following local street names:

Seabrook

- Ocean Boulevard

Hampton

- Ocean Boulevard
- Ashworth Avenue (southbound)

North Hampton

- Ocean Boulevard

Rye

- Ocean Boulevard
- Pioneer Road
- Sagamore Avenue

Portsmouth

- Sagamore Avenue
- Miller Avenue
