= Salisbury (CDP), Massachusetts =

Salisbury, Massachusetts
- Census-designated place
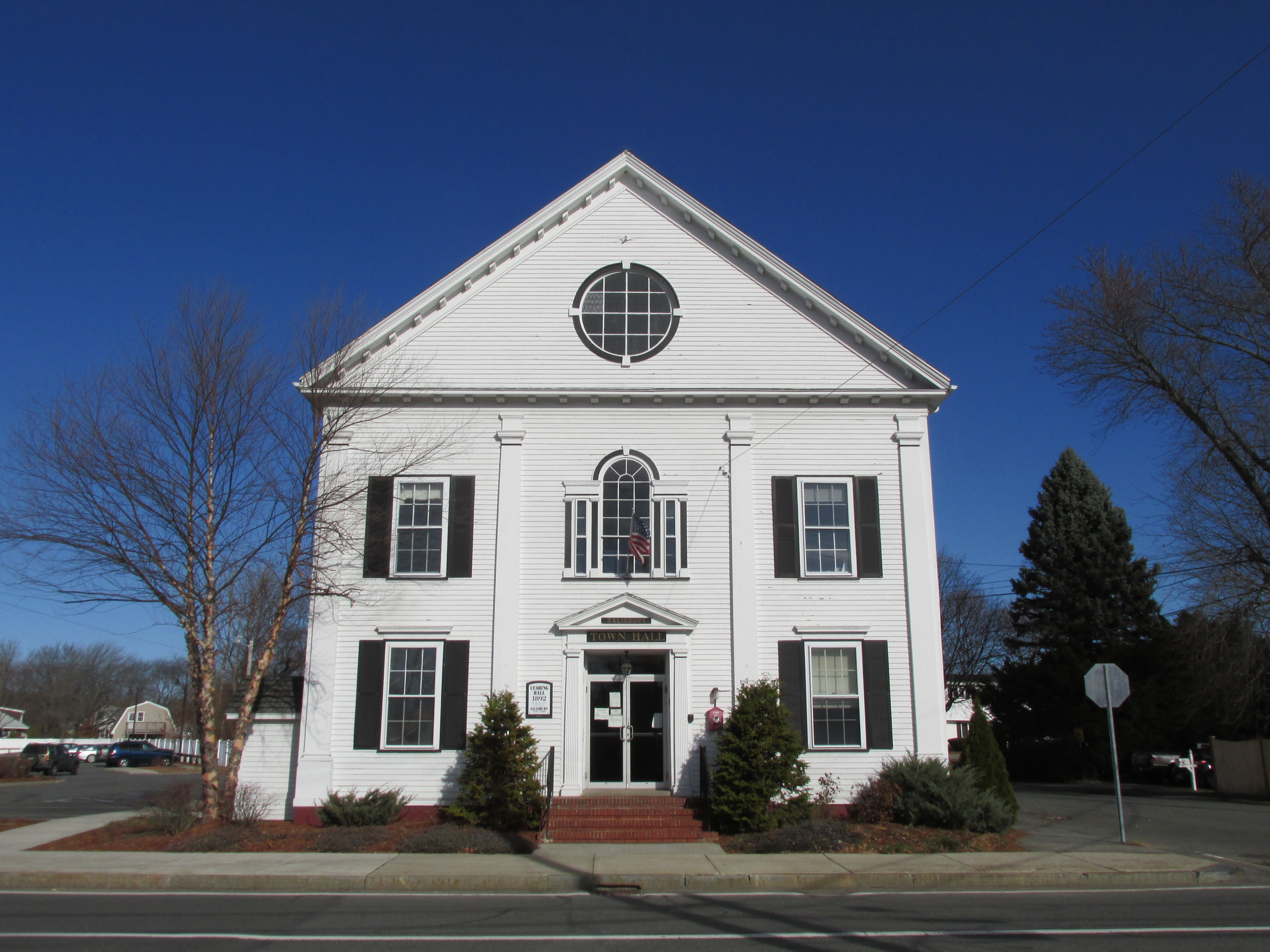
- Town Hall

- Location in Essex County and the state of Massachusetts.
- Coordinates: 42°50′23″N 70°50′13″W
- Country: United States
- State: Massachusetts
- County: Essex
- Town: Salisbury

Area
  - Total: 7.76 sq mi (20.10 km^{2})
  - Land: 5.88 sq mi (15.23 km^{2})
  - Water: 1.88 sq mi (4.87 km^{2})
- Elevation: 30 ft (9 m)

Population (2020)
  - Total: 5,629
  - Density: 957.1/sq mi (369.55/km^{2})
- Time zone: UTC-5 (Eastern (EST))
  - Summer (DST): UTC-4 (EDT)
- ZIP code: 01952
- Area code: 978
- FIPS code: 25-59210
- GNIS feature ID: 0613745

Salisbury is a census-designated place (CDP) in the town of Salisbury in Essex County, Massachusetts, United States. The population was 4,869 at the 2010 census.

== Geography ==
According to the United States Census Bureau, the CDP has a total area of 7.5 square miles (19.4 km^{2}), of which 6.0 square miles (15.5 km^{2}) is land and 1.5 square miles (3.9 km^{2}) (20.08%) is water.

== Demographics ==
Historical population
Census	Pop.	Note	%±
2020	5,629		—
U.S. Decennial Census

As of the census of 2000, there were 4,484 people, 1,886 households, and 1,091 families residing in the CDP. The population density was 293.4 people/km^{2} (760 people/mi^{2}). There were 2,927 housing units at an average density of 191.5 units per square kilometre (496 units/mi^{2}). The racial makeup of the CDP was 97.23% White, 0.54% African American, 0.27% Native American, 0.49% Asian, 0.16% Pacific Islander, 0.33% from other races, and 0.98% from two or more races. 1.47% of the population were Hispanic or Latino of any race.

There were 1,886 households, out of which 25.4% had children under the age of 18 living with them, 42.3% were married couples living together, 10.9% have a woman whose husband does not live with her, and 42.1% were non-families. 32.4% of all households were made up of individuals, and 11.6% had someone living alone who was 65 years of age or older. The average household size was 2.36 and the average family size was 3.05.

In the CDP, the population was spread out, with 21.7% under the age of 18, 6.6% from 18 to 24, 31.6% from 25 to 44, 26.0% from 45 to 64, and 14.0% who were 65 years of age or older. The median age was 39 years. For every 100 females, there were 96.7 males. For every 100 females age 18 and over, there were 94.7 males.

The median income for a household in the CDP was $41,961, and the median income for a family was $51,806. Males had a median income of $41,910 versus $32,373 for females. The per capita income for the CDP was $21,345. 8.0% of the population and 4.7% of families were below the poverty line. Out of the total people living in poverty, 13.8% are under the age of 18 and 4.6% are 65 or older.
