= Little River (New Hampshire) =

Little River (New Hampshire) may refer to:

- Little River (Ammonoosuc River tributary)
- Little River (Big River tributary)
- Little River (Brentwood, New Hampshire), a tributary of the Exeter River
- Little River (Exeter, New Hampshire), another tributary of the Exeter River
- Little River (Lamprey River tributary)
- Little River (Merrimack River tributary), also in Massachusetts
- Little River (New Hampshire Atlantic coast)
