= Exeter (CDP), New Hampshire =

Census-designated place in New Hampshire, United States

Exeter, New Hampshire
- Census-designated place
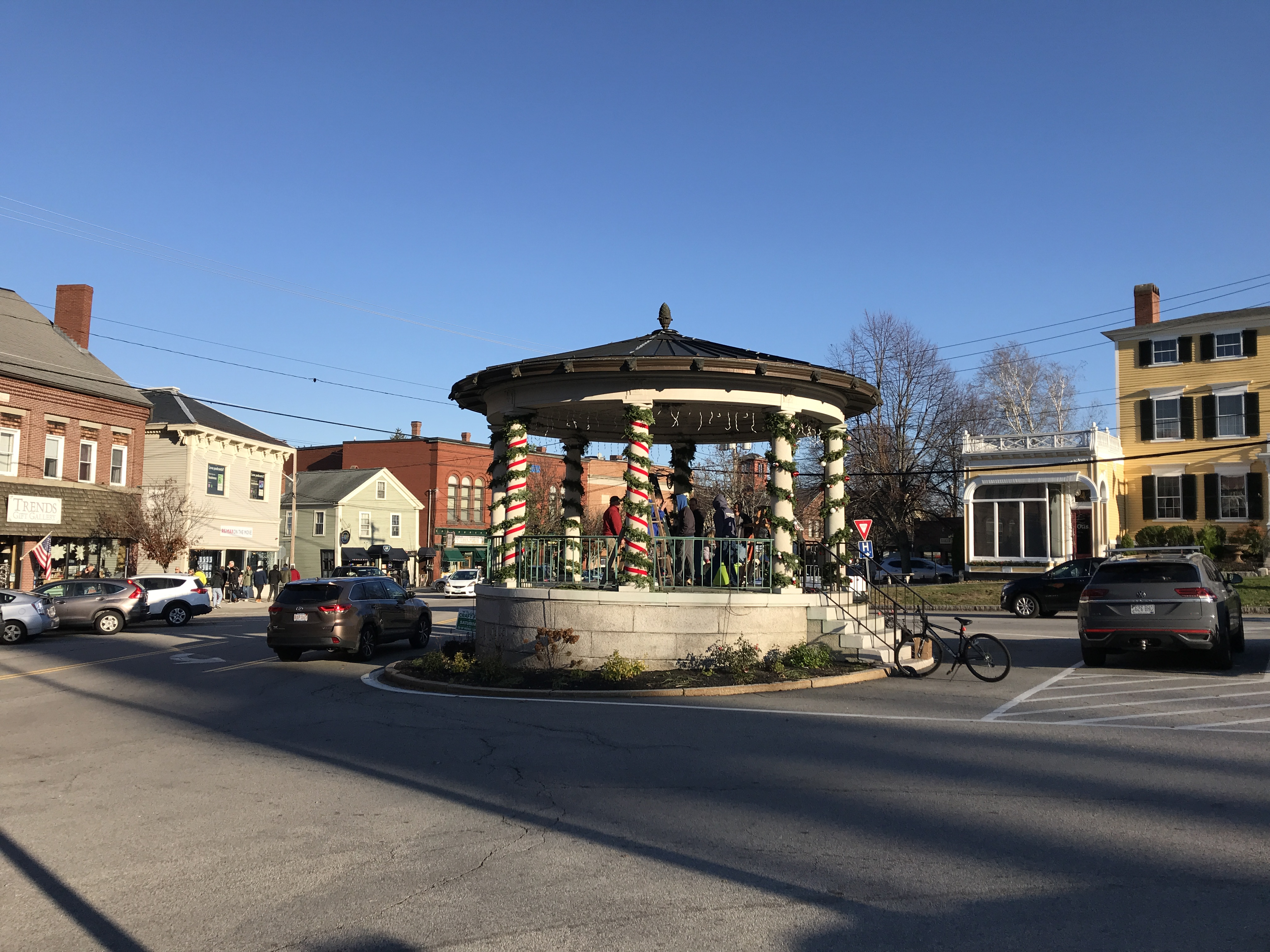
- Exeter Bandstand

- Location within New Hampshire Location within the United States
- Coordinates: 42°58′53″N 70°56′51″W
- Country: United States
- State: New Hampshire
- County: Rockingham
- Town: Exeter

Area
  - Total: 4.64 sq mi (12.03 km^{2})
  - Land: 4.50 sq mi (11.65 km^{2})
  - Water: 0.15 sq mi (0.39 km^{2})
- Elevation: 36 ft (11 m)

Population (2020)
  - Total: 10,109
  - Density: 2,248.3/sq mi (868.08/km^{2})
- Time zone: UTC-5 (Eastern (EST))
  - Summer (DST): UTC-4 (EDT)
- ZIP code: 03833
- Area code: 603
- FIPS code: 33-25300
- GNIS feature ID: 2378063

Exeter is a census-designated place (CDP) and the main village in the town of Exeter, New Hampshire, United States. The population of the CDP was 10,109 at the 2020 census, out of 16,049 in the entire town.

== Geography ==
The CDP is in the southeastern part of the town of Exeter, on both sides of the Exeter River where it flows into the tidal Squamscott River. The CDP is bordered to the northeast by the town of Stratham and to the east by New Hampshire Route 101, Dearborn Brook, and New Hampshire Route 88 (Holland Way and Hampton Falls Road). The southern edge of the CDP is formed by an unnamed brook and the Exeter River. The western border of the CDP follows the Pan Am Railways line and the Little River to Colcord Pond. The northern border follows Allard Street and Epping Road (New Hampshire Route 27), passes through woodlands to Oak Street Extension, then follows Forest Street, Wadleigh Street, Salem Street, the Pan Am Railways line again, and Norris Brook to the Squamscott River, which it follows north to the Stratham town line.

NH Route 101 bypasses the CDP to the north, with access from three exits. Route 101 leads east 4 miles (6 km) to Interstate 95 in Hampton and west 26 miles (42 km) to Interstate 93 in Manchester. New Hampshire Route 108 passes through the center of the CDP, leading north 12 miles (19 km) to Durham and south 18 miles (29 km) to Haverhill, Massachusetts. New Hampshire Route 27 passes through the center of Exeter as Main Street, Water Street, and High Street, and leads east and west parallel to Route 101. New Hampshire Route 111 runs west out of town as Front Street, leading 7 miles (11 km) to Kingston, and heads east out of town with Route 27 before splitting east-northeast to North Hampton. New Hampshire Route 88 leads southeast from the east side of Exeter 5 miles (8 km) to Hampton Falls. Route 85 leads north from the center of the CDP 4 miles (6 km) to Newfields. New Hampshire Route 111A leads west from Exeter 7 miles (11 km) to Brentwood.

According to the U.S. Census Bureau, the Exeter CDP has a total area of 4.6 square miles (12.0 km^{2}), of which 4.5 square miles (11.6 km^{2}) are land and 0.2 square miles (0.4 km^{2}), or 3.24%, are water. The Squamscott River, which starts in the CDP at the head of tide where the Exeter River flows into it, runs north from Exeter to Great Bay.

== Demographics ==
Historical population
Census	Pop.	Note	%±
1950	4,977		—
1960	5,896		18.5%
1970	6,439		9.2%
1980	8,947		39.0%
1990	9,556		6.8%
2000	9,759		2.1%
2010	9,242		−5.3%
2020	10,109		9.4%
U.S. Decennial Census

As of the census of 2010, there were 9,242 people, 4,077 households, and 2,368 families residing in the CDP. There were 4,342 housing units, of which 265, or 6.1%, were vacant. The racial makeup of the CDP was 95.3% white, 0.6% African American, 0.1% Native American, 2.0% Asian, 0.02% Pacific Islander, 0.2% some other race, and 1.8% from two or more races. 1.6% of the population were Hispanic or Latino of any race.

Of the 4,077 households in the CDP, 28.3% had children under the age of 18 living with them, 42.4% were headed by married couples living together, 11.6% had a female householder with no husband present, and 41.9% were non-families. 34.5% of all households were made up of individuals, and 13.5% were someone living alone who was 65 years of age or older. The average household size was 2.23, and the average family size was 2.88.

22.1% of residents in the CDP were under the age of 18, 6.7% were from age 18 to 24, 24.2% were from 25 to 44, 31.8% were from 45 to 64, and 15.4% were 65 years of age or older. The median age was 43.2 years. For every 100 females, there were 90.2 males. For every 100 females age 18 and over, there were 86.7 males.

For the period 2011–15, the estimated median annual income for a household was $66,495, and the median income for a family was $86,373. Male full-time workers had a median income of $55,853 versus $43,114 for females. The per capita income for the CDP was $38,703. 8.0% of the population and 4.5% of families were below the poverty line, along with 7.4% of people under the age of 18 and 4.6% of people 65 or older.
