= Candia, New Hampshire =

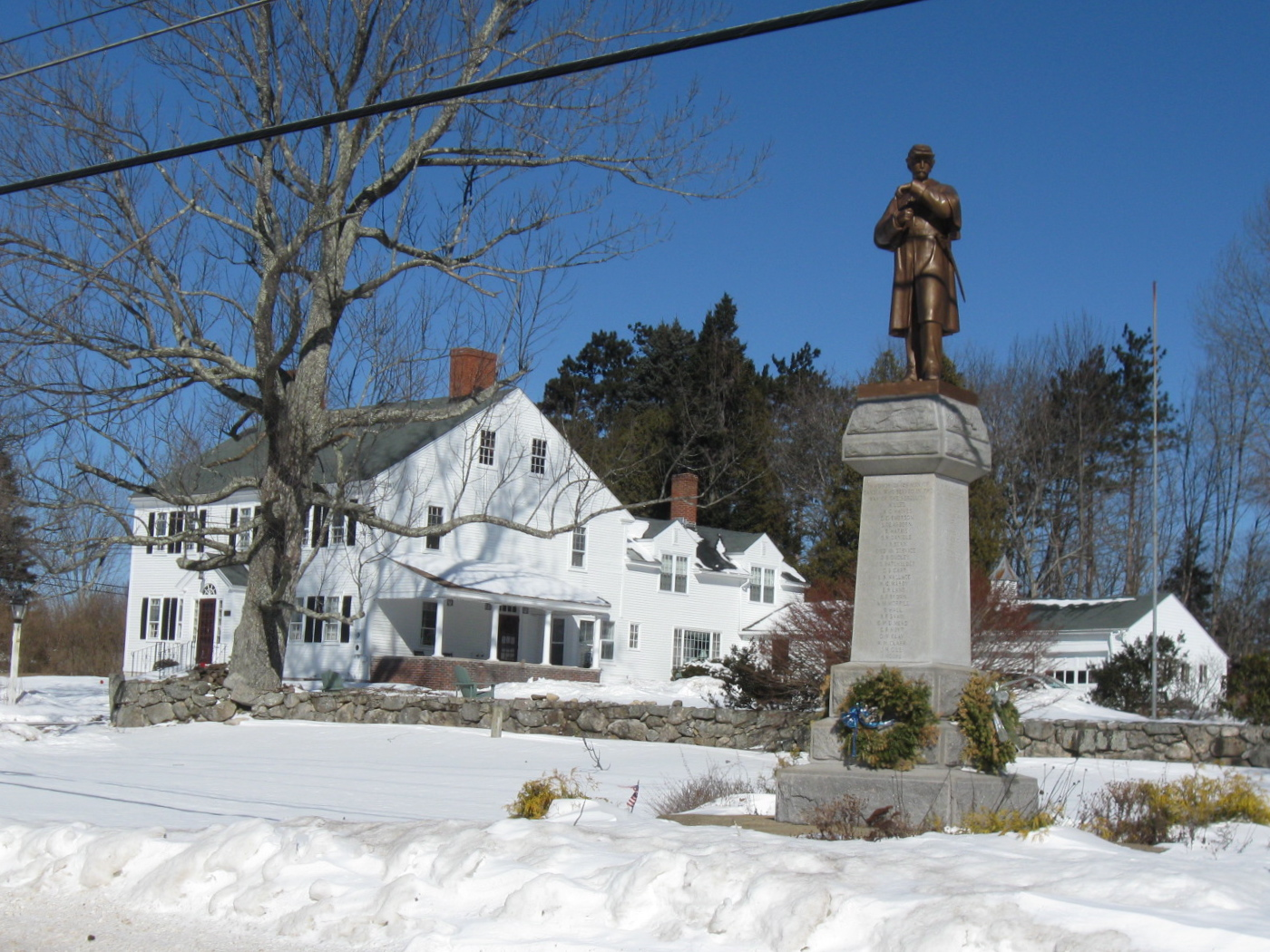
- Civil War monument on High Street

- Seal

- Location in Rockingham County and the state of New Hampshire.
- Coordinates: 43°03′35″N 71°18′36″W
- Country: United States
- State: New Hampshire
- County: Rockingham
- Incorporated: 1763
- Villages: Candia; Candia Four Corners; East Candia; Bean Island

Area
  - Total: 30.6 sq mi (79.2 km^{2})
  - Land: 30.3 sq mi (78.6 km^{2})
  - Water: 0.23 sq mi (0.6 km^{2}) 0.75%
- Elevation: 548 ft (167 m)

Population (2020)
  - Total: 4,013
  - Density: 132/sq mi (51.1/km^{2})
- Time zone: UTC-5 (Eastern)
  - Summer (DST): UTC-4 (Eastern)
- ZIP code: 03034
- Area code: 603
- FIPS code: 33-09300
- GNIS feature ID: 873558
- Website: www.candianh.org

Candia is a town in Rockingham County, New Hampshire, United States. The population was 4,013 at the 2020 census. The town includes the villages of Candia, Candia Four Corners and East Candia.

== History ==
Settled in 1743, Candia was once part of Chester and known as "Charmingfare", probably because of the many bridle paths or "parades" through the pleasant scenery. Charmingfare was incorporated in 1763 and named Candia "in compliment to Governor Benning Wentworth, who was once a prisoner on the island of Candia (an alternative ancient name of Crete since its Venetian domination), in the Mediterranean Sea."

Candia was served by the Portsmouth & Concord Railroad, which stretched between its namesake cities. In 1862 the segment between Candia and Suncook was abandoned, coinciding with the opening of a new segment between Manchester and Candia. Therefore, the new line ran from Manchester to Portsmouth via Candia. In 1895 ownership of the line passed to the Boston & Maine Railroad, who made it their Portsmouth Branch. Passenger service ended in 1954. The last trains passed through Candia in the early 1980s. The track was abandoned in 1982 and removed between 1983 and 1985. Today the railbed is part of the Rockingham Recreational Trail.

== Geography ==
Candia is in southeastern New Hampshire, along the western edge of Rockingham County. The town is bordered to the west by Merrimack County. According to the U.S. Census Bureau, the town has a total area of 30.6 square miles (79.2 km^{2}). 30.3 square miles (78.6 km^{2}) of it are land and 0.2 square miles (0.6 km^{2}) of it are water, comprising 0.75% of the town. Notable villages in the town include Candia proper, near the town's northern border; Candia Four Corners, closer to the geographic center of the town; and East Candia, near the town's eastern border.

The majority of Candia is drained to the east by the North Branch River, a tributary of the Lamprey River and part of the Piscataqua River watershed. The southern part and some of the western side of town drain toward Massabesic Lake in neighboring Auburn, part of the Merrimack River watershed. The highest point in town is Hall Mountain, at 941 feet (287 m) above sea level, located in Bear Brook State Park in the northwestern part of the town. (The main entrance to the state park and most of its facilities are in neighboring Allenstown.)

Candia is bisected by two state highways, Route 43 running north from Route 101 through the Candia Four Corners to the Deerfield town line, and Route 27, running east–west from the Hooksett town line through the Candia Four Corners to the Raymond town line. Route 101 is the major east–west thoroughfare through southern New Hampshire and travels through the southern part of Candia.

=== Adjacent municipalities ===
- Deerfield (north)
- Raymond (east)
- Chester (southeast)
- Auburn (south)
- Hooksett (west)

== Demographics ==
Historical population
Census	Pop.	Note	%±
1790	1,040		—
1800	1,186		14.0%
1810	1,290		8.8%
1820	1,273		−1.3%
1830	1,362		7.0%
1840	1,430		5.0%
1850	1,482		3.6%
1860	1,575		6.3%
1870	1,456		−7.6%
1880	1,340		−8.0%
1890	1,108		−17.3%
1900	1,057		−4.6%
1910	993		−6.1%
1920	780		−21.5%
1930	812		4.1%
1940	965		18.8%
1950	1,243		28.8%
1960	1,490		19.9%
1970	1,997		34.0%
1980	2,989		49.7%
1990	3,557		19.0%
2000	3,911		10.0%
2010	3,909		−0.1%
2020	4,013		2.7%
U.S. Decennial Census

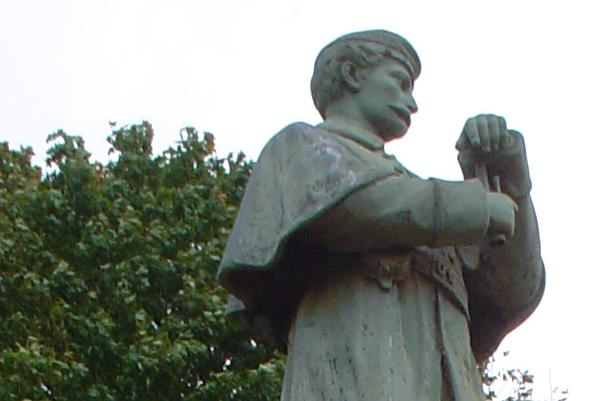
Soldiers' Monument

As of the census of 2000, there were 3,911 people, 1,359 households, and 1,108 families residing in the town. The population density was 129.0 inhabitants per square mile (49.8/km^{2}). There were 1,384 housing units at an average density of 45.6 per square mile (17.6/km^{2}). The racial makeup of the town was 98.11% White, 0.43% African American, 0.46% Native American, 0.59% Asian, 0.03% Pacific Islander, 0.10% from other races, and 0.28% from two or more races. Hispanic or Latino of any race were 0.87% of the population.

There were 1,359 households, out of which 40.0% had children under the age of 18 living with them, 72.0% were married couples living together, 5.2% had a female householder with no husband present, and 18.4% were non-families. 12.7% of all households were made up of individuals, and 3.2% had someone living alone who was 65 years of age or older. The average household size was 2.88 and the average family size was 3.14.

In the town, the population was spread out, with 26.6% under the age of 18, 6.0% from 18 to 24, 33.6% from 25 to 44, 26.5% from 45 to 64, and 7.2% who were 65 years of age or older. The median age was 38 years. For every 100 females, there were 102.1 males. For every 100 females age 18 and over, there were 102.0 males.

The median income for a household in the town was $61,389, and the median income for a family was $67,163. Males had a median income of $43,260 versus $31,127 for females. The per capita income for the town was $25,267. About 2.3% of families and 2.6% of the population were below the poverty line, including 2.3% of those under age 18 and 5.3% of those age 65 or over.

== Education ==
Candia is part of School Administrative Unit 15, along with Hooksett and Auburn. There is one public school in Candia, the Henry W. Moore School for kindergarten through eighth grade, located near the Candia Four Corners on Deerfield Road.

High school education students from Candia attend school outside of the district, currently under contract at Pinkerton Academy in Derry. Candia is also home to Jesse Remington High School, a private Christian school that offers grades 9–12. Some Candia residents send their children to other private high schools in the area, including Trinity High School in Manchester.

In 2016 there were about 200 students from Candia attending Manchester High School Central, the public high school that Candia previously contracted with. That year Candia voters voted to change their high school from Manchester Central to Pinkerton Academy, effective 2018. The votes were 1,090 in favor and 113 against.

== Transportation ==
Three New Hampshire State Routes cross Candia.

- NH 27 connects Hooksett in the west to Raymond in the east. It is known locally as High Street in the western half of town, and joins Raymond Road just to the east of NH 43.
- NH 43 begins in Candia at an interchange with NH 101, and joins Old Candia Road, following that road until it intersects Main Street, and then heads north on Main Street to the intersection of NH 27, and from there northwards follows Deerfield Road towards the town of Deerfield.
- NH 101 is a freeway that passes through the southeastern part of town, connecting Auburn in the south to Raymond in the east. There is one interchange in town, to NH 43 (Old Candia Road).

== Sites of interest ==
- Fitts Museum, operated by the Candia Historical Society
- Candia Vineyards, an award-winning vineyard with unique varietals
- Charmingfare Farm, a farm and petting zoo
- Candia Springs Adventure Park, formerly Liquid Planet water park
- Stephen Clay Homestead, bed and breakfast
- Candia Woods Golf Links, an 18-hole public golf course. Voted in Golf magazine as New Hampshire's "Friendliest Course"
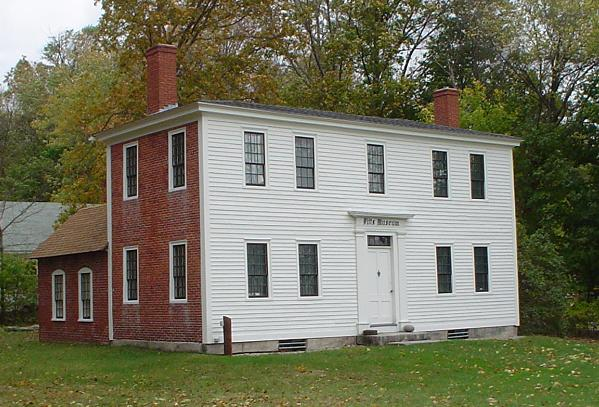
Fitts Museum

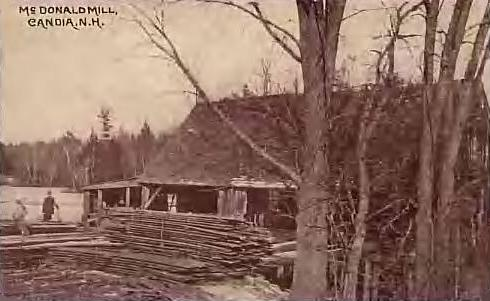
McDonald Mill c. 1915

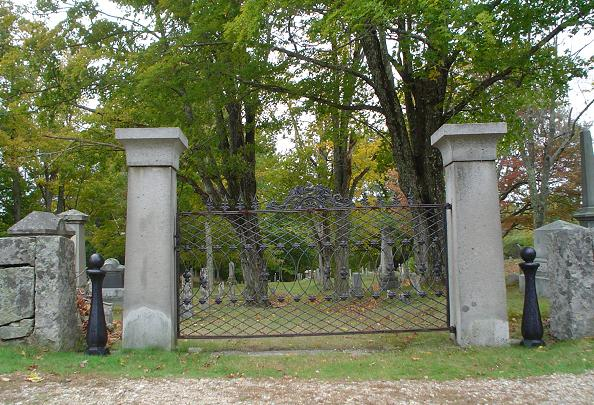
Gate, Candia Congregational Cemetery

== Emergency services ==
Fire and Emergency Medical Services are provided by the Candia Fire Department, a volunteer department organized in 1925. Today, the department staffs two paid personnel 7 days a week, 8am to 6pm. The off hours are covered by call personnel or surrounding communities. This department provides fire suppression, rescue, and paramedic-level ambulance transport and Emergency Medical Services to the citizens of Candia and the surrounding communities. The closest hospitals are the Elliot Hospital, a Level Two trauma center, and Catholic Medical Center, one of the most advanced cardiac care centers in New England. Both of these facilities are located approximately 20 minutes away in Manchester. Exeter Hospital is also located about 20 minutes away in Exeter.

Police protection is provided by the Candia Police Department, assisted by the New Hampshire State Police and other local municipal police departments.

== Notable people ==
- Sarah Bagley (1806–1889), labor leader and activist
- Harry Cobe (1885–1966), race car driver who ran in the inaugural Indianapolis 500
- Joe Duarte (born 1941), member of the New Hampshire House of Representatives
- Sam Walter Foss (1858–1911), poet, librarian
- Albert Palmer (1831–1887), 29th mayor of Boston
- Frederick Smyth (1819–1899), 30th governor of New Hampshire

== See also ==
- New Hampshire Historical Marker No. 141: Sam Walter Foss 1858–1911
- New Hampshire Historical Marker No. 237: East Candia: The Langford District / Candia: One Town, Five Villages
