= East Candia, New Hampshire =

Unincorporated community in New Hampshire, United States

- Unincorporated community
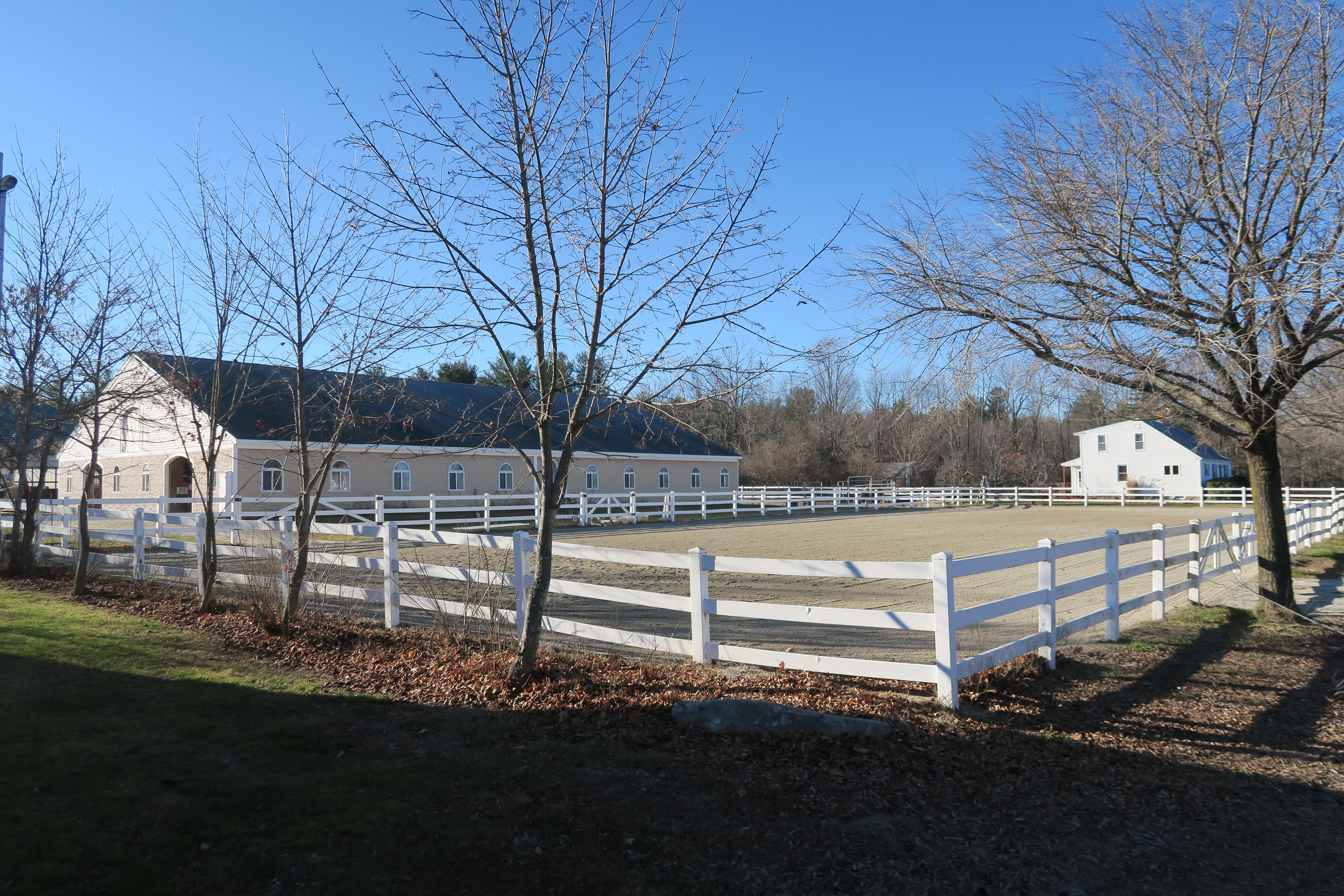
- Painted Image Farm

- Location within New Hampshire Location within the United States
- Coordinates: 43°02′53″N 71°14′59″W
- Country: United States
- State: New Hampshire
- County: Rockingham
- Town: Candia
- Elevation: 443 ft (135 m)
- Time zone: UTC-5 (Eastern (EST))
  - Summer (DST): UTC-4 (EDT)
- ZIP code: 03040
- Area code: 603
- GNIS feature ID: 871261

East Candia is an unincorporated community in the town of Candia, New Hampshire, United States.

The village, as the name suggests, is located in the eastern part of the town of Candia, close to the town border with Raymond. The community is centered upon the intersection of Langford Road and Depot Road, approximately 0.5 miles (0.8 km) south of Langford Road's intersection with New Hampshire Route 27.

== See also ==
- New Hampshire Historical Marker No. 237: East Candia: The Langford District / Candia: One Town, Five Villages
