= Joshua Smith (minister) =

American hymn compiler and Baptist minister (1760–1795)

Joshua Smith (1760–1795) was an early American hymn compiler and Baptist minister in New Hampshire, USA.

Smith was born in 1760 and was a Baptist lay minister in New Hampshire. Smith authored Divine Hymns, or Spiritual Songs, a book of hymns first published in either 1784 or 1791 featuring and popularizing well-known folk songs such as "Jesus Christ the Apple Tree". The book was published in Norwich and Exeter, New Hampshire. By 1803 at least eleven more editions were published. Many of his pieces were set to music by Jeremiah Ingalls, another New England composer. Smith lived in Canaan and Brentwood, New Hampshire, where he was active in the local Baptist congregations. Smith died of tuberculosis in 1795.
