= Rockingham County Botanical Garden =

Botanical garden in New Hampshire

Coordinates: 43°0′32″N 71°3′2″W

The Rockingham County Botanical Garden was a botanical garden in Brentwood, New Hampshire, United States.

The garden began in 1996 as an idea of the University of New Hampshire Cooperative Extension Master Gardeners in Rockingham County. In subsequent years, the group obtained 10 acres (4.0 ha) of county land, formed a nonprofit organization, and developed the garden.

This land has been returned to Rockingham County. Currently the University of New Hampshire Cooperative Extension Master Gardener volunteers bring education about gardening, plants, soil, insects and more to the people of New Hampshire through community projects, public presentations and the Ask UNH Extension InfoLine.

== See also ==
- List of botanical gardens in the United States
