= Schanda =

Schanda is a surname. Notable people with the surname include:

- Jan Schanda (born 1977), German footballer
- Joseph Schanda (1930–2024), American politician
