= Little River (Brentwood, New Hampshire) =

- Location within New Hampshire Location within the United States

Location
- Country: United States
- State: New Hampshire
- County: Rockingham
- Towns: Kingston, Brentwood

Physical characteristics
- Source
  - location: Kingston
  - coordinates: 42°56′33″N 71°5′24″W
  - elevation: 175 ft (53 m)
- Mouth: Exeter River
  - location: Brentwood
  - coordinates: 42°58′30″N 71°2′3″W
  - elevation: 65 ft (20 m)
- Length: 7.3 mi (11.7 km)

The Little River is a 7.3-mile-long (11.7 km) stream in the towns of Kingston and Brentwood in Rockingham County, New Hampshire, United States. It is a tributary of the Exeter River, part of the Great Bay/Piscataqua River watershed in the New Hampshire Seacoast region. The river should not be confused with the Little River of Exeter, another tributary of the Exeter River less than 3 miles (5 km) away.

The Little River rises in the northwestern part of Kingston and follows a winding course generally northeast through flat or slightly hilly terrain. The river turns north as it enters Brentwood and reaches the Exeter River east of Brentwood's town center.

== See also ==
- List of rivers of New Hampshire
