= New Hampshire Route 88 =

State highway in Rockingham County, New Hampshire, US

New Hampshire Route 88
- Map of Rockingham County in southeastern New Hampshire with NH 88 highlighted in red

Route information
- Maintained by NHDOT
- Length: 6.676 mi (10.744 km)

Major junctions
- West end: NH 108 in Exeter
- NH 27 / NH 111 in Exeter
- East end: US 1 in Hampton Falls

Location
- Country: United States
- State: New Hampshire
- Counties: Rockingham

Highway system
- New Hampshire Highway System; Interstate; US; State; Turnpikes
← NH 87	→ I-89

New Hampshire Route 88 (abbreviated NH 88) is a 6.676-mile-long (10.744 km) east–west state highway in Rockingham County in southeastern New Hampshire, United States. It runs from Hampton Falls to Exeter.

The western terminus of NH 88 is in Exeter at New Hampshire Route 108, though it is unsigned northwest of its intersection with New Hampshire Route 27 and New Hampshire Route 111 other than at the NH 108 intersection itself. The eastern terminus is in Hampton Falls at U.S. Route 1 (Lafayette Road).

== Route description ==
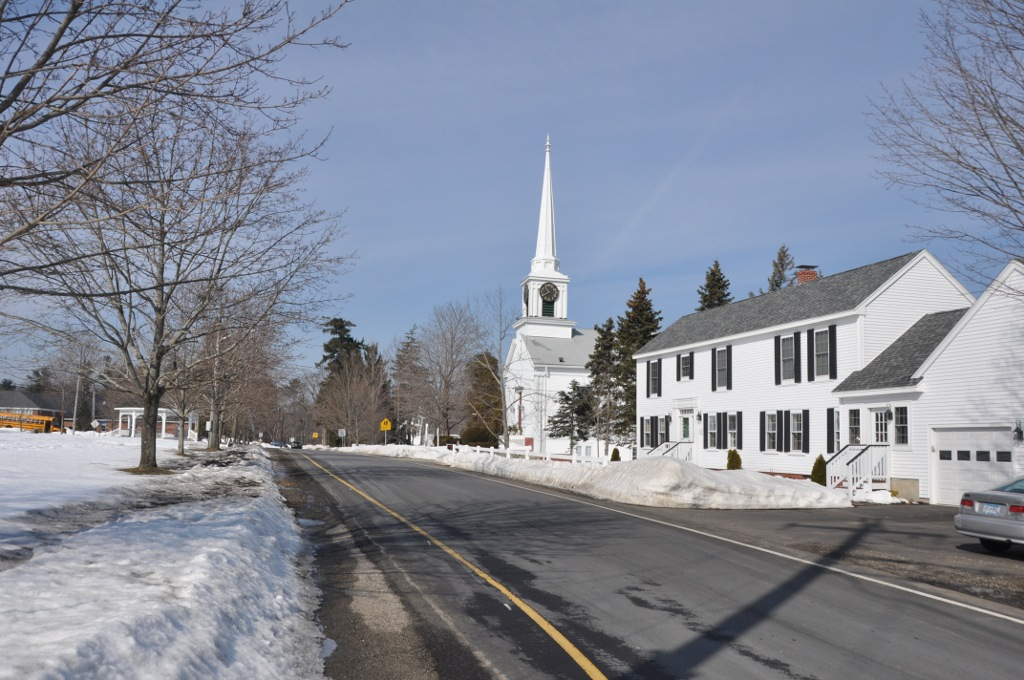
Eastern end of Route 88, at the village green in Hampton Falls

NH 88 begins in the west at NH 108 on the northern edge of Exeter, less than 1/4 mile (0.40 km) from the exit 11 junction with NH 101 (the Exeter-Hampton Expressway) in Stratham. The highway heads southeast, roughly paralleling NH 101 for 1.1 miles before intersecting NH 27/NH 111 east of town. This westernmost stretch of NH 88 is very poorly signed; in fact NH 88 westbound to NH 108 is completely unsigned from NH 27/NH 111. Signage on NH 108 approaching this intersection is ambiguous as to whether Holland Way (the official name of this stretch) is part of NH 88, or simply an access road "To 88". NH 88 briefly (and silently) overlaps NH 27 and NH 111, then NH 88 splits off southeast again and crosses into Hampton Falls. The highway continues for 5.5 miles (8.9 km), passes underneath Interstate 95 without an interchange and then terminates at US 1 in the center of town, just feet from the eastern terminus of NH 84.

Access to I-95 from NH 88 can be facilitated by either NH 107 in Seabrook or NH 101 in Hampton, both via US 1.

== Junction list ==
The entire route is in Rockingham County.

Location	mi	km	Destinations	Notes
Exeter	0.000	0.000	NH 108 (Portsmouth Avenue) to NH 101 / NH 33 – Exeter, Stratham	Western terminus
Exeter	1.143	1.839	NH 27 / NH 111 east (Hampton Road) – North Hampton	Western end of wrong-way concurrency with NH 27 / NH 111
Exeter	1.233	1.984	NH 27 / NH 111 west (High Street) – Exeter, Kingston	Eastern end of wrong-way concurrency with NH 27 / NH 111
Hampton Falls	6.676	10.744	US 1 (Lafayette Road) to NH 84 – Hampton, Portsmouth	Eastern terminus
1.000 mi = 1.609 km; 1.000 km = 0.621 mi: Concurrency terminus
