= NH 27 =

NH 27 may refer to:

- National Highway 27 (India)
- New Hampshire Route 27, United States
- Nico Hülkenberg, German Formula 1 driver
