= Joseph Schanda =

American politician (1930–2024)

Member of the New Hampshire House of Representatives
- In office 1990–1992 Serving with Albert Caswell
- Constituency: Rockingham 12th
- In office 1992–1994 Serving with Albert Caswell and Betsy Coes
- Constituency: Rockingham 19th

Personal details
- Born: July 15, 1930 Newmarket, New Hampshire, U.S.
- Died: October 17, 2024 (aged 94) Brentwood, New Hampshire, U.S.
- Party: Democratic

Joseph Schanda (July 15, 1930 – October 17, 2024) was an American politician from the state of New Hampshire. He served as a Democratic member of the New Hampshire House of Representatives, representing the Rockingham 12th district, consisting of the town of Newmarket, from 1990 to 1992, and the Rockingham 19th district, consisting of Newmarket and Newfields, from 1992 to 1994. Schanda died in Brentwood, New Hampshire on October 17, 2024, at the age of 94.
