= Candia Four Corners, New Hampshire =

Unincorporated community in New Hampshire, United States

- Unincorporated community
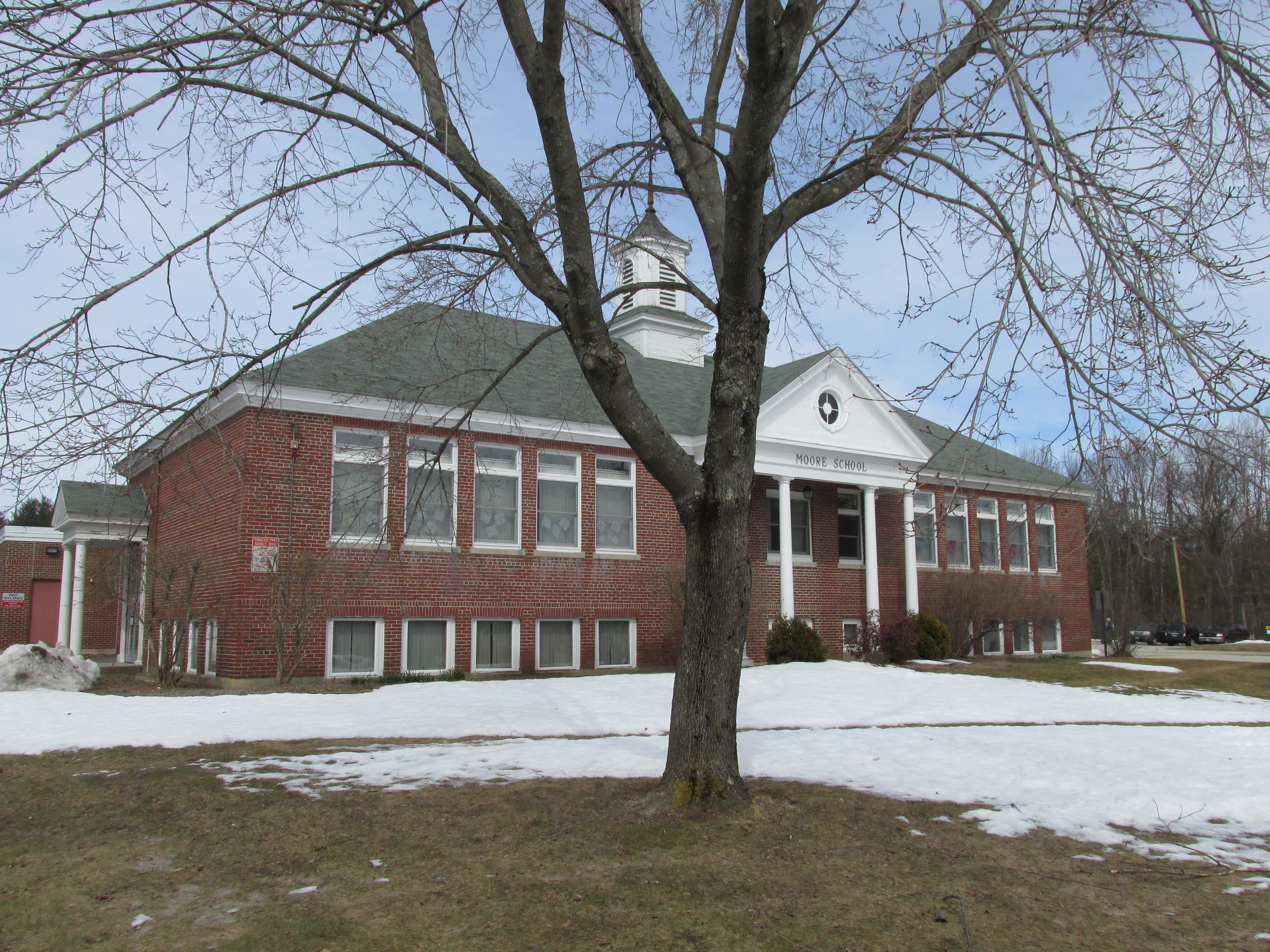
- Moore School in 2013

- Location within New Hampshire Location within the United States
- Coordinates: 43°03′41″N 71°17′18″W
- Country: United States
- State: New Hampshire
- County: Rockingham
- Town: Candia
- Elevation: 495 ft (151 m)
- Time zone: UTC-5 (Eastern (EST))
  - Summer (DST): UTC-4 (EDT)
- ZIP code: 03034
- Area code: 603
- GNIS feature ID: 865977

The Candia Four Corners is an unincorporated community located near the center of the town of Candia, New Hampshire, United States.

== Roads ==
The name "Four Corners" refers to three roads which intersect at the village center: High Street, Main Street, and Deerfield Road. High Street, running east–west, is a portion of New Hampshire Route 27, which stretches from Hooksett (to the west) to Hampton Beach (to the east). This road was formerly the main east–west thoroughfare through southern New Hampshire, but was replaced by New Hampshire Route 101, a four-lane expressway to the south of the Four Corners. Main Street, departing to the south, and Deerfield Road, going north, make up a portion of New Hampshire Route 43, which originates in Candia at NH 101.

== Businesses, organizations, and town facilities ==
Much of the town of Candia's business, governmental, and recreational facilities are located near the Four Corners. The Candia Town Hall, Moore Park, and the Smyth Public Library are also located on High Street. Deerfield Road is the location of the Candia Volunteer Fire Department's station and the Henry W. Moore School. All of these facilities are located within approximately 500 feet (150 m) of the main intersection, effectively making it the focal point of the town.
