= John Garrison Cutler =

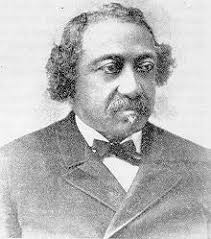

John Garrison Cutler (May 10, 1833 – February 7, 1913) was a well-known African American entrepreneur and member of the New Hampshire Republican Party who hosted sitting presidents and many others at his "Cutler's Sea View Hotel" at Hampton Beach, New Hampshire, in the late 1800s until his death in 1913. He was the grandson of an enslaved man who fought in the Revolutionary War, thus earning his freedom.

== Sea View Hotel & Cutler's Café ==
Cutler is most known for the exclusive hotel complex he built at Hampton Beach, New Hampshire, which was known for a time as the "Summer capital of New Hampshire". Informal political meetings would be held on the large hotel porch, or in the restaurant or pool hall on the complex grounds. He became known in the New Hampshire Republican party as a "kingmaker". The Rockingham County Republican Party met at his hotel to endorse William Taft for the United States Presidential nomination.

His hotel guests included Presidents Franklin Pierce, James A. Garfield, and Benjamin Harrison; then ex-president Grover Cleveland; General Robert E. Lee; James G. Blaine; P. T. Barnum and Tom Thumb; boxer John L. Sullivan; writers Oliver Wendell Holmes, John Greenleaf Whittier, and Celia Thaxter; Senator Charles Sumner; every New Hampshire governor during Cutler's lifetime; plus scores of other politicians, educators, and scientists who were well known during that time. Ten-term New Hampshire Congressman Cyrus A. Sulloway summered at Cutler's for many years. John G. Cutler's restaurant "Cutler's Café" was very well known both for cuisine, and as a meeting place. Each fall the "Cutler Club" hosted an annual wild bird dinner.

In 1907, future Governor John H. Bartlett led a group of residents to petition the Board of Selectmen to form the Hampton Beach Village District. The article passed, and the first meeting for Beach residents was held at Cutler's Café on June 26 of that year.

== Business ventures ==
John G. Cutler was one of several children who grew up working in his father Rufus Cutler's dry goods store on Water Street in Exeter. His aunt, Harriet P. (Cutler), and her husband, George Harris, owned a similar shop directly next door. The families lived over the shops. John G. obtained the store in 1864 and later added a saloon and billiards parlor in the basement rear. Both the Cutler and Harris buildings burned to the ground in the Great Conflagration of 1873 that consumed three blocks of downtown businesses. John G. rebuilt the store which still stands today at 129 Water Street. According to the Exeter Newsletter, he was known as the "best-dressed man in Exeter, without exception and sported a liberal display of diamonds."

In 1875 he purchased the "Sea View Cottages" on Ocean Avenue at Hampton Beach and renamed it "Cutler's Sea View Cottages". He and his wife, Hattie, moved there permanently and employed immigrants from Poland and Ireland. Cutler's became the first hotel at the beach to be open year-round, and was quite near to the mansions of dignitaries like Franklin Pierce at Boar's Head. Cutler's establishment burned ten years later, in 1895, and he had it rebuilt quickly and in grand style, bringing the total to 26 rooms. It was then renamed "Cutler's Sea View Hotel". Picture postcards were sold with a photo of the new hotel. On the grounds were also a stable for forty horses, a pool hall, and several other small out-buildings.

In 1897, construction of a street railway began to Hampton Beach, eventually making it less exclusive. To take advantage of this new clientele, in 1898 he built "Cutler's Café", a large restaurant adjacent to the hotel. This was built for the train-riding public and had 14 guest rooms and modern plumbing, but also included two private dining rooms.

The hotel stood for one hundred years until it burned in 1985. The restaurant remains, and is currently known as "Ron's Landing at Rocky Bend". The street leading to the rear still bears the name "Cutler Avenue".

Cutler and his wife also purchased a plot of nearby land slightly more inland, known historically as Ox Commons and Glade Path. He and wife Hattie platted it in 1913 to be sold as house lots (New Hampshire Deeds). The neighborhood still stands today.

== Family ==
John Garrison Cutler was born in Exeter, New Hampshire, on May 10, 1833, to Rufus E. and Anna (Cilley) Cutler. His paternal grandfather was Tobias Cutler, one of the many Black Revolutionary War soldiers who settled in Exeter after the war. His grandmother was Dorothy Paul, sister of Rev. Thomas Paul of Boston.

At the age of 50, John Garrison Cutler married Harriet Anne (Hattie) Brewster on July 29, 1873. They had two children, who both died young. The family grave is in the High Street Cemetery in Hampton.

== Legacy and honors ==
Cutler Avenue, at the rear of the then hotel on Ocean Boulevard in Hampton Beach, New Hampshire, was named after him.

A plaque in his honor was placed on his former dry goods store at 127 Water Street, Exeter, in February 2021.
