= Little River (Exeter, New Hampshire) =

- Location within New Hampshire Location within the United States

Location
- Country: United States
- State: New Hampshire
- County: Rockingham
- Towns: Brentwood, Exeter

Physical characteristics
- Source
  - location: Brentwood
  - coordinates: 43°0′31″N 71°1′24″W
  - elevation: 125 ft (38 m)
- Mouth: Exeter River
  - location: Exeter
  - coordinates: 42°58′27″N 70°56′37″W
  - elevation: 25 ft (7.6 m)
- Length: 7.2 mi (11.6 km)

Basin features
- Tributaries
  - left: Bloody Brook
  - right: Dudley Brook, Scamen Brook

The Little River is a 7.2-mile-long (11.6 km) stream largely in the town of Exeter in Rockingham County, New Hampshire, United States. It is a tributary of the Exeter River, part of the Great Bay/Piscataqua River watershed in the New Hampshire Seacoast region. The river should not be confused with the Little River of Brentwood and Kingston, another Exeter River tributary less than 3 miles (5 km) to the west.

The Little River rises in the northeastern corner of Brentwood and flows east, quickly entering the town limits of Exeter. The river flows southeast through wetlands and past low hills, passing through Colcord Pond just west of the downtown part of Exeter. The river flows into the Exeter River at the southern edge of the campus of Phillips Exeter Academy.

== See also ==
- List of rivers of New Hampshire
