= Exeter River =

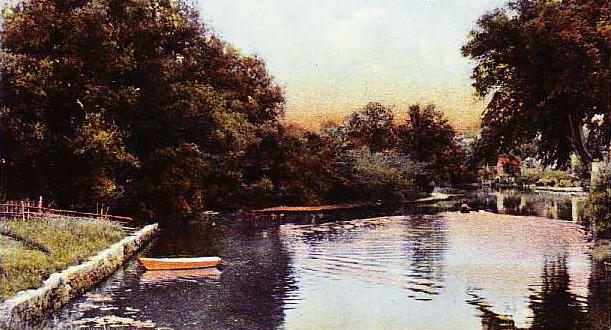
- The Exeter River in Exeter, NH (1907)

- Location within New Hampshire Location within the United States

Location
- Country: United States
- State: New Hampshire
- County: Rockingham
- Towns: Chester, Sandown, Danville, Raymond, Fremont, Brentwood, Exeter

Physical characteristics
- Source
  - location: Chester
  - coordinates: 42°57′37″N 71°16′18″W
  - elevation: 455 ft (139 m)
- Mouth: Squamscott River
  - location: Exeter
  - coordinates: 42°58′55″N 70°56′43″W
  - elevation: 0 ft (0 m)
- Length: 40.5 mi (65.2 km)

Basin features
- Tributaries
  - left: Towle Brook, Wason Brook, Fordway Brook, Little River (Exeter)
  - right: Wilson Brook, Little River (Brentwood), Great Brook

The Exeter River is a 40.5-mile-long (65.2 km) river located in Rockingham County in southeastern New Hampshire, United States.

It rises in the town of Chester, 12 miles (19 km) southeast of Manchester. It follows a winding course east and northeast to Exeter, where it becomes the Squamscott River, a tidal river leading north to Great Bay. There are falls and small dams at several locations along the river. A significant dam (Great Dam) that had long existed at the river's termination in Exeter was removed in the summer of 2016, restoring the river's flow to its natural state where it meets the Squamscott River.

The Exeter River drainage basin encompasses an area of 126 square miles (330 km^{2}). The upper 33.3 miles (53.6 km) of the river, from its headwaters to its confluence with Great Brook in Exeter, were designated into the NH Rivers Management and Protection Program in August 1995.

== See also ==
- List of rivers of New Hampshire
