= Jesus Christ the Apple Tree =

18th century poem

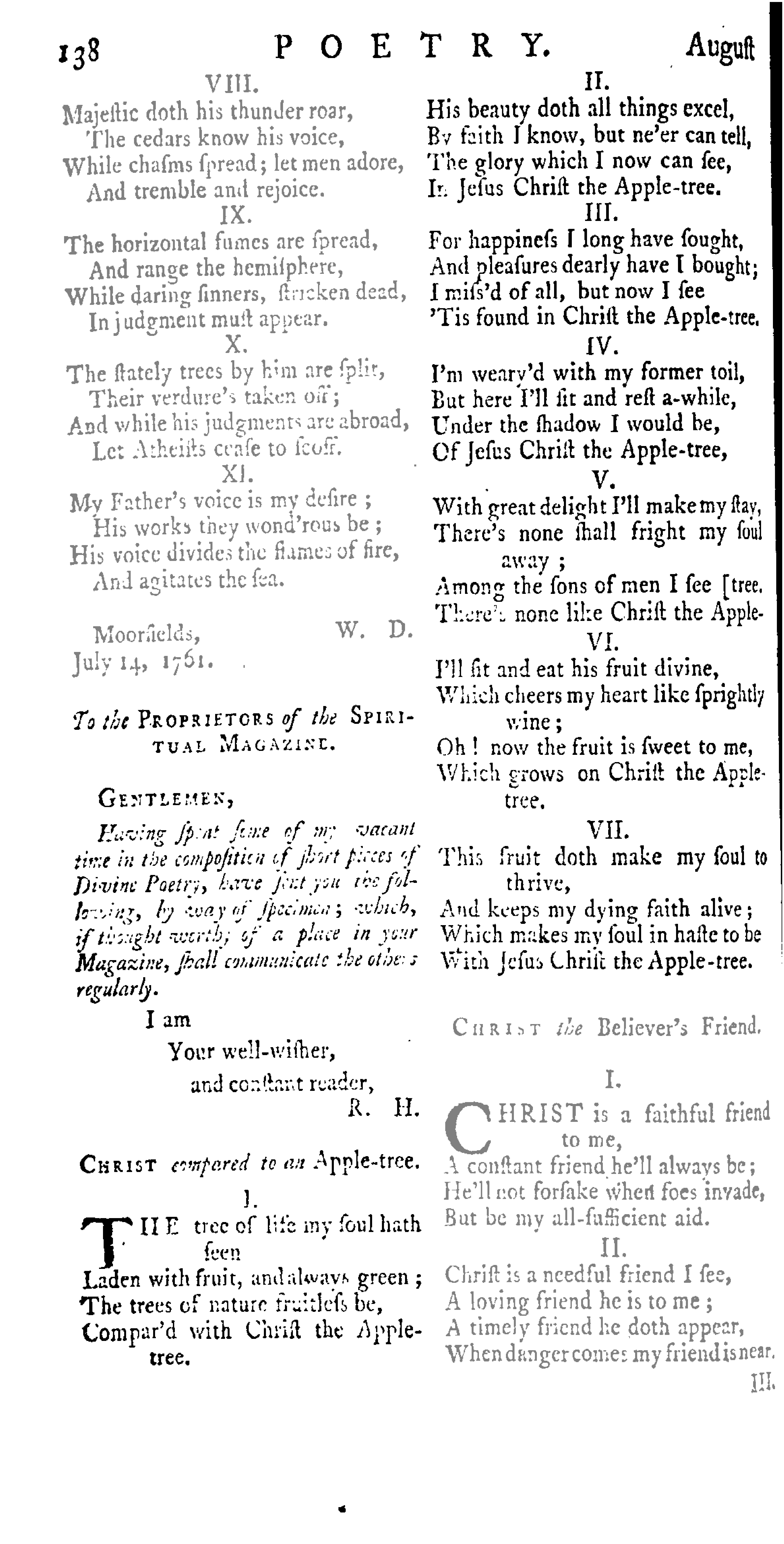
The original words as published in “The Spiritual Magazine” in August 1761.

Jesus Christ the Apple Tree lyrics in an 1897 republication of 1797 printing

Jesus Christ the Apple Tree (also known as Apple Tree and, in its early publications, as Christ Compared to an Apple-tree) is a poem, possibly intended for use as a carol, written in the 18th century. It has been set to music by a number of composers, including Jeremiah Ingalls (1764–1838), Elizabeth Poston (1905–1987) and John Rutter.

The first known publication, beginning The Tree of Life My Soul Hath Seen, was in London's Spiritual Magazine in August, 1761. This credits "R.H." as the submitter and presumed author. R.H. has been shown most likely to refer to Rev. Richard Hutchins, a Calvinist Baptist clergyman then in Long Buckby, Northamptonshire. Another early printing, which cannot be dated and could be earlier, is an English broadsheet. This broadsheet uses the term "Methodists," which certainly places it after about 1730, when the term first came into use at Oxford University, and probably substantially later, when the religious movement had spread.

The hymn's first known appearance in a hymnal, and in America, was in 1784 in Divine Hymns, or Spiritual Songs: for the use of Religious Assemblies and Private Christians compiled by Joshua Smith, a lay Baptist minister from New Hampshire. It became prevalent in American publications but not English ones. Consequently, American authorship was sometimes assumed despite the lack of evidence.

The song may be an allusion to both the apple tree in Song of Solomon 2:3 which has been interpreted as a metaphor representing Jesus, and to his description of his life as a tree of life in Luke 13:18–19 and elsewhere in the New Testament including Revelation 22:1–2 and within the Old Testament in Genesis. Apple trees were commonly grown in England and there was an old English tradition of wassailing or wishing health to apple trees on Christmas Eve. The song is now performed by choirs around the world, especially during the Christmas season as a Christmas carol.

Another motivation of the song may have been to Christianize old English winter season songs used in wassailing the apple orchards — pouring out libations or engaging in similar ceremonies to seek fertility of the trees.

== Lyrics ==
The tree of life my soul hath seen,
Laden with fruit and always green;
The trees of nature fruitless be,
Compared with Christ the Apple Tree.

His beauty doth all things excel,
By faith I know but ne'er can tell
The glory which I now can see,
In Jesus Christ the Appletree.

For happiness I long have sought,
And pleasure dearly I have bought;
I missed of all but now I see
'Tis found in Christ the Appletree.

I'm weary with my former toil -
Here I will sit and rest awhile,
Under the shadow I will be,
Of Jesus Christ the Appletree.

With great delight I’ll make my stay,
There’s none shall fright my soul away;
Among the sons of men I see
There’s none like Christ the Appletree.

I’ll sit and eat this fruit divine,
It cheers my heart like spirit’al wine;
And now this fruit is sweet to me,
That grows on Christ the Appletree.

This fruit doth make my soul to thrive,
It keeps my dying faith alive;
Which makes my soul in haste to be
With Jesus Christ the Appletree.

== See also ==
- List of Christmas carols
