= Albert Caswell =

American politician

Member of the New Hampshire House of Representatives from the Rockingham 12th district
- In office 1988–1992

Member of the New Hampshire House of Representatives from the Rockingham 19th district
- In office 1992–1994

Personal details
- Born: Albert William Caswell Jr. July 14, 1931 New Hampshire, U.S.
- Died: November 23, 2019 (aged 88) Brentwood, New Hampshire, U.S.
- Party: Democratic

Albert William Caswell Jr. (July 14, 1931 – November 23, 2019) was an American politician. A member of the Democratic Party, he served in the New Hampshire House of Representatives from 1988 to 1994.

== Life and career ==
Caswell was born in New Hampshire, the son of Albert Caswell Sr. and Gladys Yvonne Marquis. He attended and graduated from Newmarket High School. After graduating, he served in the armed forces during the Korean War, which after his discharge, he served as a member of the Newmarket school board in Newmarket, New Hampshire.

Caswell served in the New Hampshire House of Representatives from 1988 to 1994.

== Death ==
Caswell died on November 23, 2019, at the Rockingham County Nursing Home in Brentwood, New Hampshire, at the age of 88.
