= New Hampshire Route 27 =

State highway in southeastern New Hampshire, US

New Hampshire Route 27
- Map of southeastern New Hampshire with NH 27 highlighted in red

Route information
- Maintained by NHDOT
- Length: 37.621 mi (60.545 km)

Major junctions
- West end: US 3 / NH 28 in Hooksett
- NH 101 in Exeter / Hampton; US 1 in Hampton
- East end: NH 1A in Hampton Beach

Location
- Country: United States
- State: New Hampshire
- Counties: Merrimack, Rockingham

Highway system
- New Hampshire Highway System; Interstate; US; State; Turnpikes
← NH 26	→ NH 28
← NH 101A	→ NH 101D

New Hampshire Route 27 (abbreviated NH 27) is a 37.621-mile-long (60.545 km) long east–west highway in southeastern New Hampshire. The western terminus of NH 27 is in Hooksett at U.S. Route 3 and New Hampshire Route 28 north of Manchester. The eastern terminus is in Hampton Beach at New Hampshire Route 1A, which runs along the New Hampshire coastline adjacent to the Atlantic Ocean.

NH 27 is a local highway which parallels the New Hampshire Route 101 expressway for its entire length. NH 27 serves the centers of many of the communities which NH 101 bypasses.

== Route description ==
Route 27 starts at an intersection with U.S. Route 3 (Hooksett Road) and New Hampshire Route 28 in southern Hooksett. It proceeds east 1/4 mile and crosses New Hampshire 28 Bypass (Londonderry Turnpike), then continues northeast through Hooksett into Candia.

Route 27 intersects New Hampshire Route 43 at Candia Four Corners, then continues east and meets NH 107 in the northwest part of Raymond. Turning southeast, the highways run concurrently past the center of Raymond, with NH 107 splitting off to the south in the eastern part of the town. NH 27 continues east into the town of Epping, where it crosses New Hampshire Route 125 (Calef Highway), a major north–south two-lane highway in eastern New Hampshire.

NH 27 then continues southeast through southern Epping, passing Star Speedway and New England Dragway, and reaches northwest Exeter, where it interchanges with New Hampshire Route 101, the major east–west freeway for the region. NH 27 then enters the town center of Exeter, and briefly runs concurrently with New Hampshire Route 111A, before both routes meet NH 111, and NH 111A terminates at its parent. NH 111 and NH 27 run concurrently until separating in the southeast corner of Exeter, 0.2 miles (0.3 km) west of NH 111's interchange with NH 101.

NH 27 continues southeast into Hampton, where it interchanges with NH 101 one last time, before entering Hampton's town center, where it intersects U.S. Route 1. NH 27 continues east, reaching its eastern terminus at NH 1A (Ocean Boulevard) at Hampton's North Beach along the Atlantic Ocean.

== History ==
=== Hooksett to Candia ===
NH 27 was formerly NH 101B from Hooksett to the intersection with NH 43 in Candia.

=== Candia to Raymond ===
The section of NH 27 between NH 43 in Candia (the former eastern terminus of NH 101B) and the eastern terminus of the NH 27/New Hampshire Route 107 concurrency in Raymond was a part of New Hampshire Route 101 until the NH 101 freeway was built in the 1980s.

=== Raymond to Hampton Beach ===
In the late 1990s, the NH 101 expressway between exit 5 (NH 107) in Raymond and exit 9 near Exeter was completed, allowing NH 101 to shift from its surface alignment between Raymond and Exeter to the freeway. NH 27 was then extended eastward from Raymond along the former routing of NH 101 to NH 108 in Exeter. Additionally, the routing of NH 101C, which ran from NH 108 east along what is now NH 27 to NH 1A in Hampton Beach, was usurped by NH 27, extending NH 27 to its current location.

The NH 101C designation was changed in 1990 due to confusion between NH 101C, NH 101D in Exeter and North Hampton, and NH 101E in Hampton. NH 101D is now the easternmost part of NH 111 while NH 101E remains but is poorly signed.

== Junction list ==
County	Location	mi	km	Destinations	Notes
Merrimack	Hooksett	0.000	0.000	US 3 / NH 28 (Hooksett Road) – Hooksett, Manchester	Western terminus
Merrimack	Hooksett	0.283	0.455	NH 28 Bypass (Londonderry Turnpike) – Auburn, Derry	
Rockingham	Candia	8.274	13.316	NH 43 (Main Street/Deerfield Road) to NH 101 – Deerfield, Northwood	
Rockingham	Raymond	11.926	19.193	NH 107 north (Deerfield Road) – Deerfield, Epsom	Western end of concurrency with NH 107
Rockingham	Raymond	15.742	25.334	NH 156 north (Nottingham Road) – Nottingham	Southern terminus of NH 156
Rockingham	Raymond	15.846	25.502	NH 107 south (Freetown Road) to NH 101 / NH 102 – Fremont, Chester	Eastern end of concurrency with NH 107
Rockingham	Epping	20.842	33.542	NH 125 (Calef Highway) to NH 101 – Lee, Brentwood	
Rockingham	Brentwood	23.308	37.511	North Road to NH 101	Exit 8 on NH 101
Rockingham	Exeter	26.271– 26.433	42.279– 42.540	NH 101 (Exeter-Hampton Expressway) – Manchester, Hampton	Exit 9 on NH 101
Rockingham	Exeter	27.686	44.556	NH 111A west (Brentwood Road) – Brentwood, Danville	Western end of concurrency with NH 111A
Rockingham	Exeter	28.426	45.747	NH 85 north (Water Street) – Newfields	Southern terminus of NH 85
Rockingham	Exeter	28.670	46.140	NH 108 south / NH 111 west (Front Street) – Kingston, East Kingston	Eastern terminus of NH 111A; western end of concurrency with NH 108 / NH 111
Rockingham	Exeter	28.901	46.512	NH 108 north (Portsmouth Avenue) – Stratham, Newmarket	Eastern end of concurrency with NH 108
Rockingham	Exeter	30.057	48.372	NH 88 east (Hampton Falls Road) – Hampton Falls	Western end of concurrency with NH 88
Rockingham	Exeter	30.147	48.517	NH 88 west (Holland Way) to NH 101 / NH 33 – Portsmouth, Manchester	Eastern end of concurrency with NH 88
Rockingham	Exeter	31.350	50.453	NH 111 east (North Hampton Road) to NH 101 – North Hampton	Eastern end of concurrency with NH 111
Rockingham	Hampton	33.754– 34.026	54.322– 54.760	NH 101 (Exeter–Hampton Expressway) to I-95 – Portsmouth, Manchester	Exit 13 on NH 101
Rockingham	Hampton	35.309	56.824	US 1 (Lafayette Road) – Portsmouth, Seabrook	
Rockingham	Hampton	37.621	60.545	NH 1A (Ocean Boulevard) – Hampton Beach, Rye	Eastern terminus
1.000 mi = 1.609 km; 1.000 km = 0.621 mi: Concurrency terminus
