= Exeter, New Hampshire =

Town in New Hampshire, United States

- Town
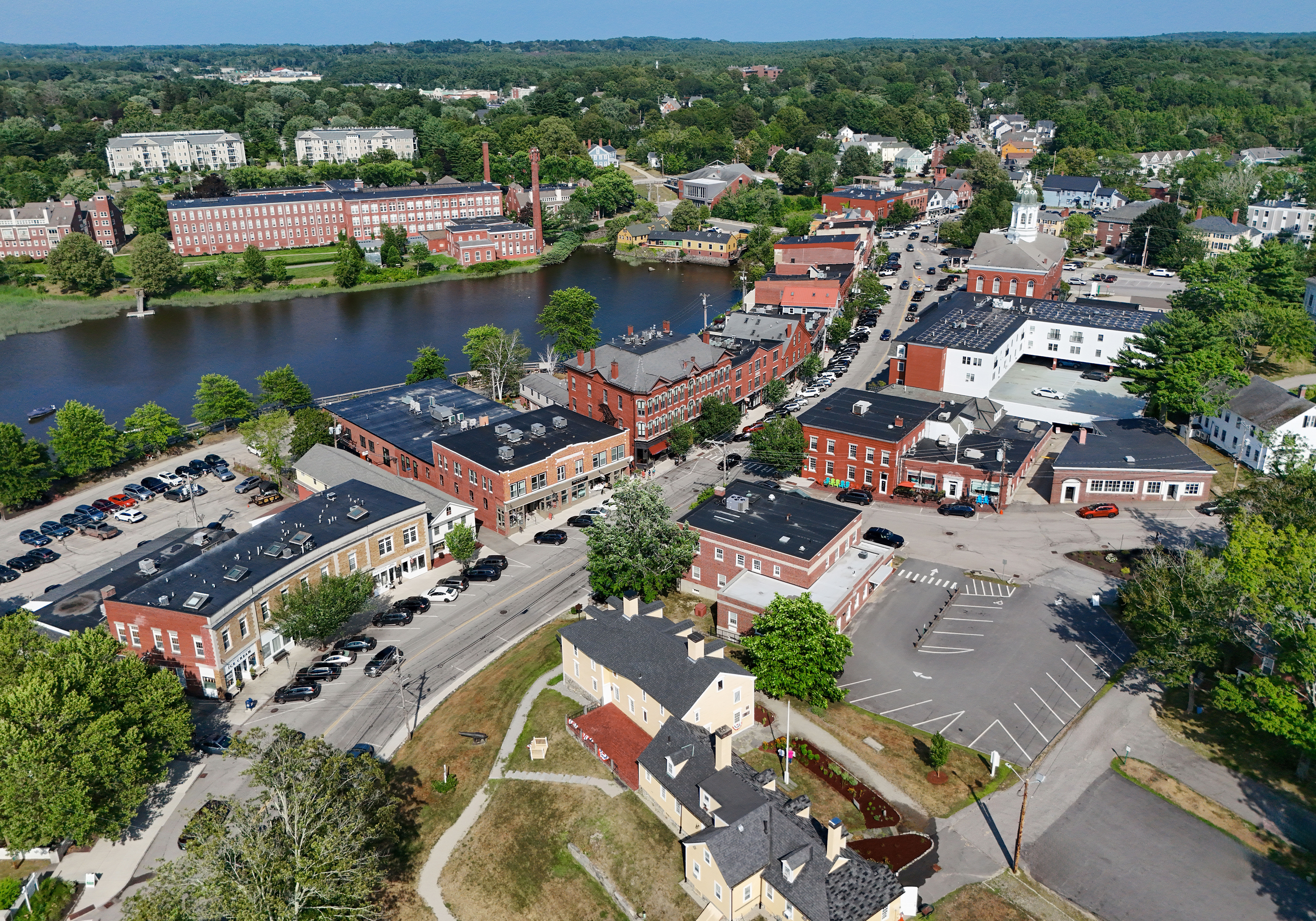
- Downtown Exeter

- Seal

- Location in Rockingham County and the state of New Hampshire
- Coordinates: 42°58′54″N 70°56′52″W
- Country: United States
- State: New Hampshire
- County: Rockingham
- Settled: April 3, 1638
- Incorporated: 1638

Area
  - Total: 20.0 sq mi (51.7 km^{2})
  - Land: 19.6 sq mi (50.8 km^{2})
  - Water: 0.35 sq mi (0.9 km^{2}) 1.80%
- Elevation: 56 ft (17 m)

Population (2020)
  - Total: 16,049
  - Density: 819/sq mi (316.1/km^{2})
- Time zone: UTC-5 (Eastern)
  - Summer (DST): UTC-4 (Eastern)
- ZIP code: 03833
- Area code: 603
- FIPS code: 33-25380
- GNIS feature ID: 873595
- Website: exeternh.gov

Exeter is a town in Rockingham County, New Hampshire, United States. Its population was 16,049 at the 2020 census, up from 14,306 at the 2010 census. Exeter was the county seat until 1997, when county offices were moved to neighboring Brentwood. Home to Phillips Exeter Academy, a private university-preparatory boarding school, Exeter is situated where the Exeter River becomes the tidal Squamscott River.

The urban center of town, where 10,109 people resided at the 2020 census, is defined by the U.S. Census Bureau as the Exeter census-designated place.

== History ==
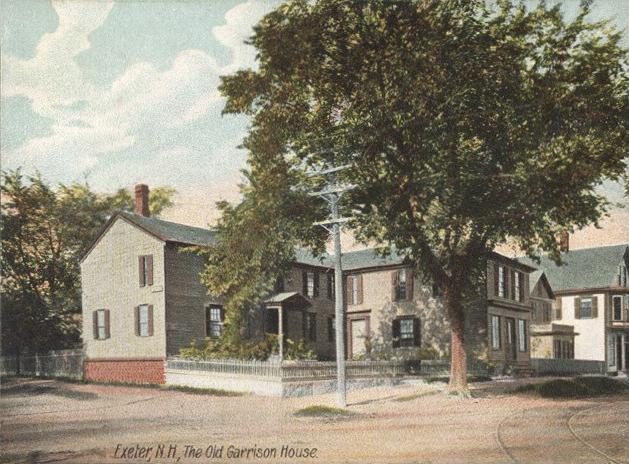
The Gilman Garrison House in 1906

For thousands of years prior to European colonization, the area was inhabited by Pennacook Abenaki villagers. The location was originally known as "M'Squamskook", meaning "Falls at the Place of the Salmon" in Abenaki language, and would later become known as "Squamscott".

About 100 Pennacook would return to the Squamscott in the spring to fish, and raise corn, pumpkin, and pigeons, and had relations to other Pennacook at Concord, Sewall's Island, and Manchester. They fished at the falls where the Exeter River becomes the tidal Squamscott, the site around which the future town of Exeter grew. The falls in Brentwood were known to have been a favorite fishing site of the native population.

=== 1638 settlement ===
On April 3, 1638, John Wheelwright, a clergyman exiled from the Puritan theocracy Massachusetts Bay Colony, purchased the land from Wehanownowit, the sagamore. Wheelwright took with him about 175 individuals to found a town he named after Exeter in Devon, England. Local government was linked with Massachusetts until New Hampshire became a separate colony in 1679, and counties were introduced in 1769.

One of the four original townships in the province, Exeter originally included Newmarket, Newfields, Brentwood, Epping, and Fremont. On July 4, 1639, 35 freemen of Exeter signed the Exeter Combination, a document written by Wheelwright to establish their own government. The settlers hunted, planted and fished, raised cattle and swine, or made shakes (shingles) and barrel staves.

Thomas Wilson established the town's first grist mill on the eastern side of the island in the lower falls. This mill was established within the first season of settling in Exeter, and his son Humphrey assumed control of the mill in 1643, when Thomas died.

Exeter escaped major damage during King Philip's War from 1675-1676. However, the town maintained a militia of 60 men and despite that, a Mr. John Robinson was killed by Indians. In 1683, Hampton Councilman Edward Gove staged his rebellion in Exeter. He was arrested and became the only New Hampshire resident to be sentenced to be hanged, drawn, and quartered. During King William's War, the Lamprey River Massacre occurred while Epping was a part of Exeter.

=== Gilman family ===
Some early settlers came from Hingham, Massachusetts, including the Gilman, Folsom, and Leavitt families. In 1647, Edward Gilman Jr. established the first sawmill, and by 1651, Gilman had a 50-ton sloop which he used to conduct business in lumber, staves, and masts. Gilman was lost at sea in 1653 while traveling to England to purchase equipment for his mills, but his family later became prominent as lumbermen, shipbuilders, merchants, and statesmen. The Gilman Garrison House and the American Independence Museum were both former homes of the Gilman family. The Gilman family also donated the land on which Phillips Exeter Academy stands, including the academy's original Yard, the oldest part of campus. Members of the Gilman family have played an important role in the United States government, including Founding Father Nicholas Gilman, as well as treasurers, a governor, representatives to the General Assembly and judges to the General Court of New Hampshire.

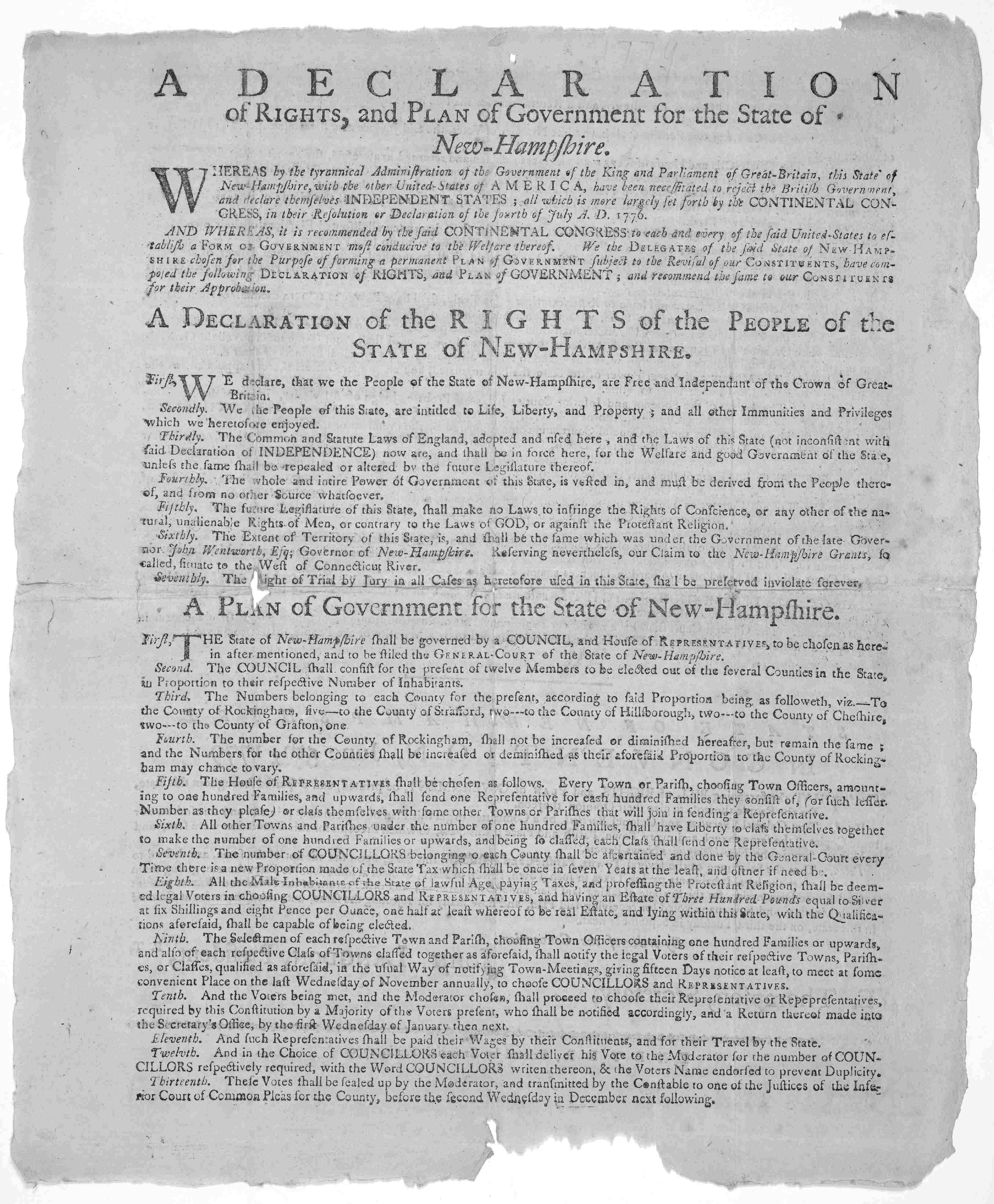
A Declaration of Rights and Plan of Government for the State of New-Hampshire, adopted by New Hampshire Convention at Exeter, June 1779

The Gilman family began trading as far as the West Indies with ships they owned out of Portsmouth. In an 1803 voyage, the 180-ton clipper Oliver Peabody, owned by Gov. John Taylor Gilman, Oliver Peabody, Col. Gilman Leavitt, and others, was boarded by brigs belonging to the Royal Navy under command of Admiral Horatio Nelson. Enforcing a blockade against the French, Nelson offered ship Captain Stephen Gilman of Exeter a glass of wine and paid him for his cargo in Spanish dollars. The trip demonstrates how far afield the merchants of Exeter reached.

=== 1700s ===
The last Native American raid on Exeter was in August 1723, and by 1725, the tribes had left the area. In 1774, the rebellious Provincial Congress began to meet in the Exeter Town House after colonial governor John Wentworth banned it from the colonial capitol at Portsmouth. In July 1775, the Provincial Congress had the provincial records seized from royal officials in Portsmouth and brought to Exeter, as well, so Exeter became New Hampshire's capital, an honor it held for 14 years.

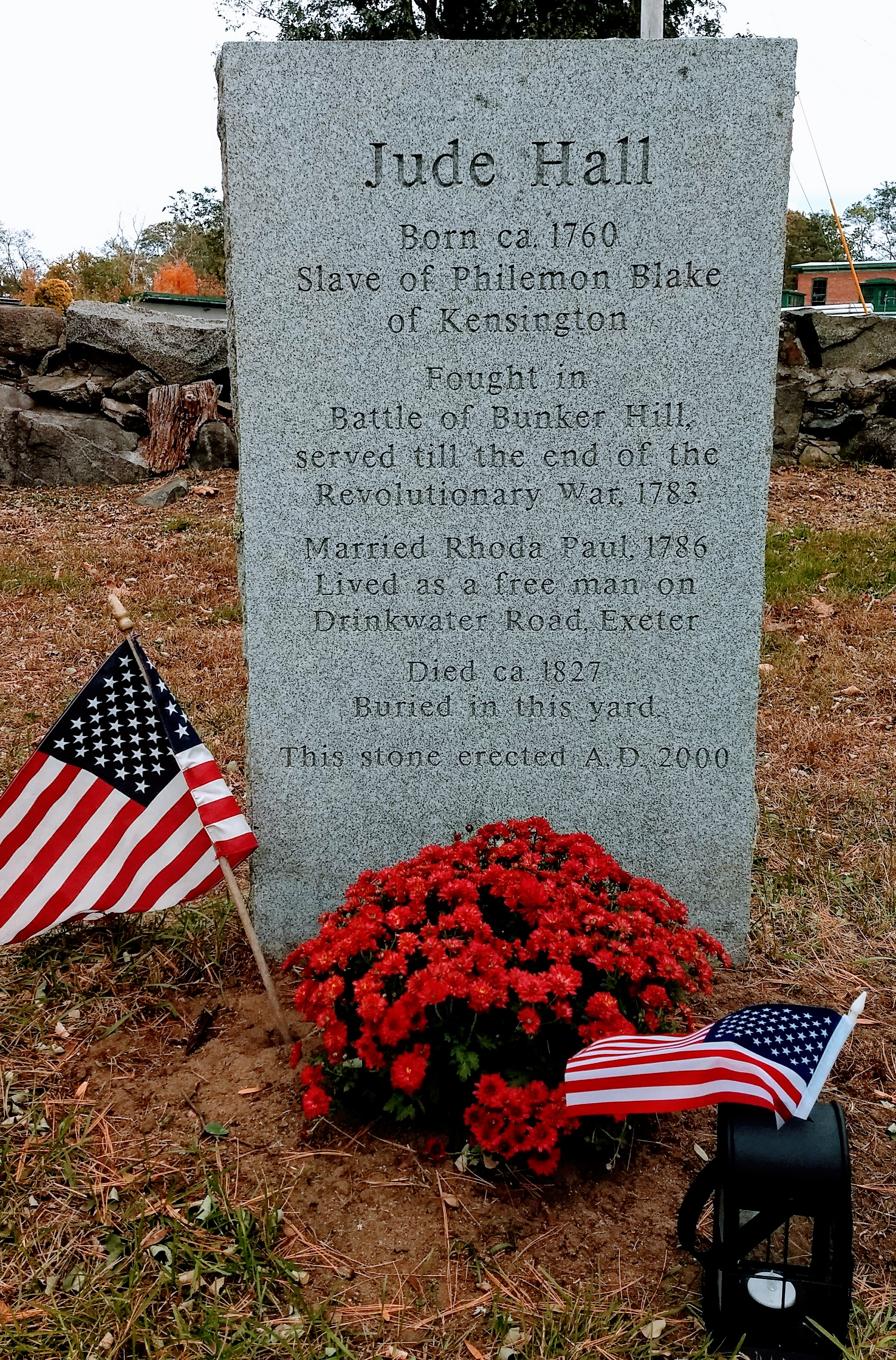
Jude Hall memorial stone

Exeter had a significant African American community, with its first census in 1790 recording 81 free African Americans (in 14 households, 11 of which they owned), and two enslaved African Americans. This was the highest percentage of African Americans in any settlement in the state at 4.7%. Many African Americans, such as Jude Hall (namesake of Jude's Pond on Drinkwater Road), earned their freedom fighting in the Revolutionary War, and many settled near the west bank of the Squamscott River after the war. Jude Hall is buried in the Winter Street cemetery.

=== 1800s ===
Reverend Thomas Paul of the African Meeting House in Boston was born in Exeter near this time, and later in 1822, abolitionist poet James Monroe Whitfield, a nephew of Jude Hall. In the late 1800s, two men had two dry-goods stores on Water Street, John Garrison Cutler and George Harris, who both had very high net worths at the time.

In 1827, the Exeter Manufacturing Company was established beside the river, using water power to produce cotton textiles. Other businesses manufactured shoes, saddles, harnesses, lumber, boxes, bricks, carriages, and bicycles. In 1836, the last schooner was launched at Exeter. In 1840, the Boston & Maine Railroad entered the town.

According to former governor Hugh Gregg, the United States Republican Party was born in Exeter on October 12, 1853, at the Squamscott Hotel at a secret meeting of Amos Tuck with other abolitionists. At this meeting, Tuck proposed forming a new political party to be called Republican. Upon learning of Tuck's meeting, in December 1853, Horace Greeley said, "I think 'Republican' would be the best name, it will sound both Jeffersonian and Madisonian, and for that reason will take well." Abraham Lincoln, the first Republican president, visited Exeter in 1860. His son, Robert Todd Lincoln, was attending Phillips Exeter Academy, the college preparatory school founded in 1781 by John Phillips. The town was also once home to the Robinson Female Seminary, established in 1867 and previously known as the Exeter Female Academy (established in 1826). Its landmark Second Empire schoolhouse, completed in 1869, burned in October 1961.

=== 1900s ===
Joanna Pellerin, president of the Rockingham Land Trust, described the Squamscott River of the 1940s:

[The] Squamscott was a place to stay away from. It stank, and was filled with dyes from the mills and sewage dumped from along Water Street.

In 1922, it was affected by the 1922 New England Textile Strike, shutting down the mills in the town over an attempted wage cut and hours increase.

In September 1965, Exeter was involved in UFO history when local teenager Norman Muscarello and two Exeter police officers, Eugene Bertrand and David Hunt, witnessed a bright red UFO at close range. Their sighting attracted national publicity and became the focus of a bestselling book, Incident at Exeter, by journalist John G. Fuller. The Air Force eventually admitted that it had been unable to identify the strange object, and it is still considered by many UFO buffs to be one of the most impressive UFO sightings on record.

=== Architecture ===
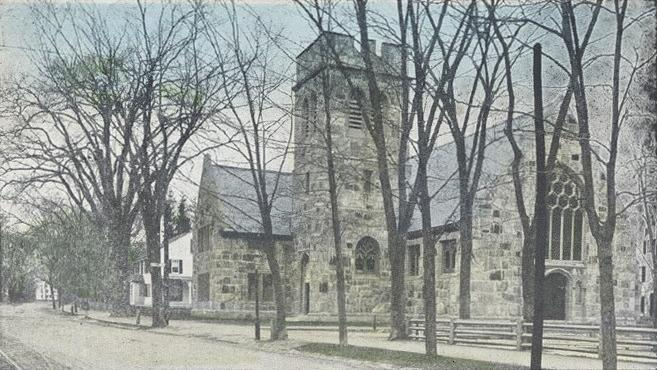
Phillips Church in 1911

Exeter has a considerable number of architectural structures. Arthur Gilman designed the Old Town Hall of 1855. The Old Public Library of 1894, which now is home to the Exeter Historical Society, was designed by the Boston firm of Rotch & Tilden. Ralph Adams Cram, who trained with Rotch & Tilden, designed both Phillips Church, built in 1897, and Tuck High School, built in 1911. Cram's firm of Cram & Ferguson designed the entire Phillips Exeter Academy campus between 1908 and 1950. More recent is the Academy Library, built in 1971 to the design of Louis I. Kahn. Sculptor Daniel Chester French created the town's war memorial in 1922. Architect Henry Bacon designed in 1916 the Swasey Pavilion at Exeter's town square.

Other features of the town include the Swasey Parkway, which replaced the wharves and warehouses along the Squamscott River, and the Ioka Theatre of 1915 on Water Street. The latter was built by Edward Mayer, an Exeter judge and resident. Mayer's opening feature was The Birth of a Nation, by D. W. Griffith. The theatre's curious name was proposed in a contest by a young woman with an enthusiasm for Scouting. Ioka was a Native American word meaning "playground".

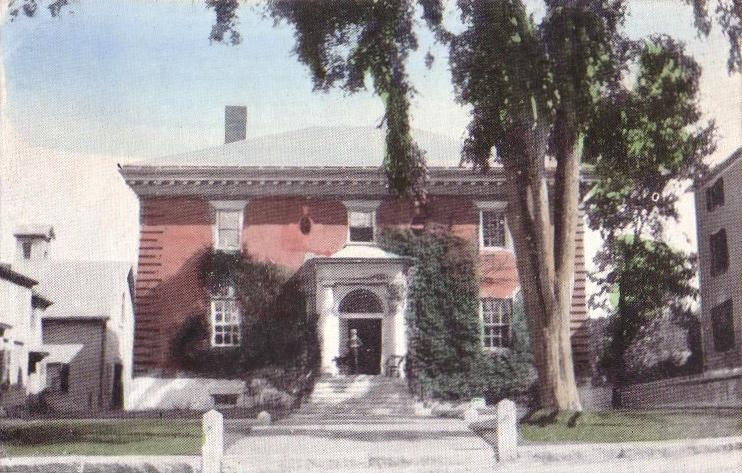
Town Offices c. 1912

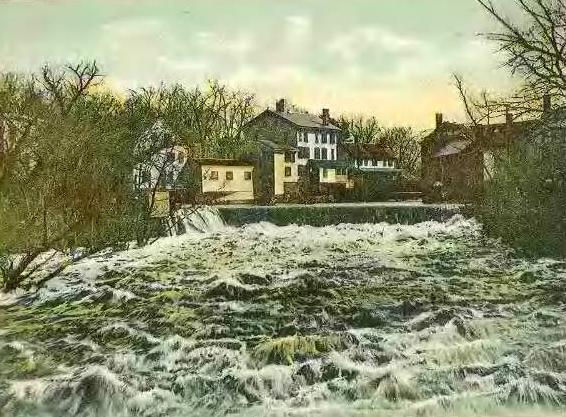
Squamscott Falls in 1907

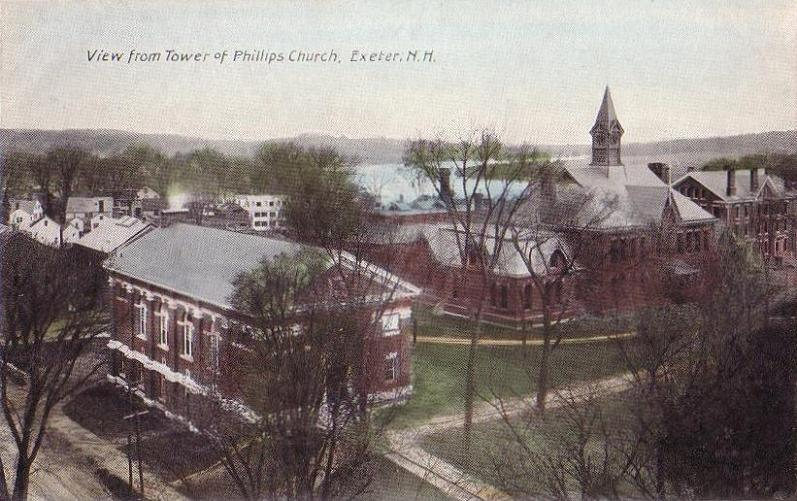
Phillips Exeter in 1910

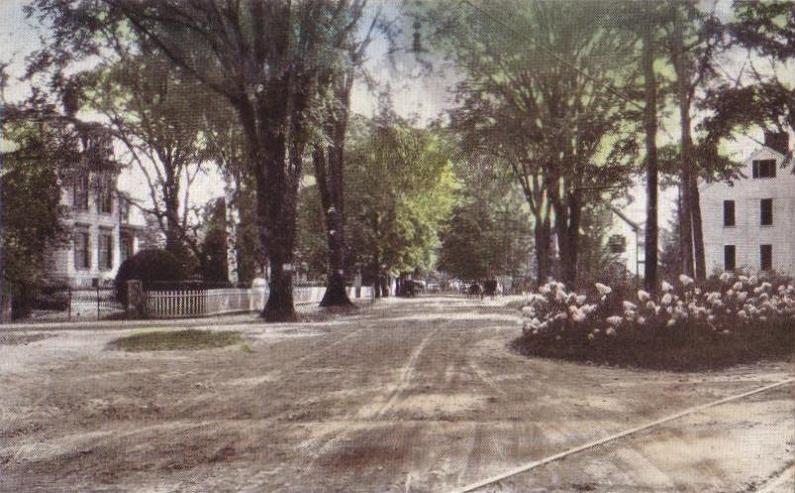
Linden Street c. 1909

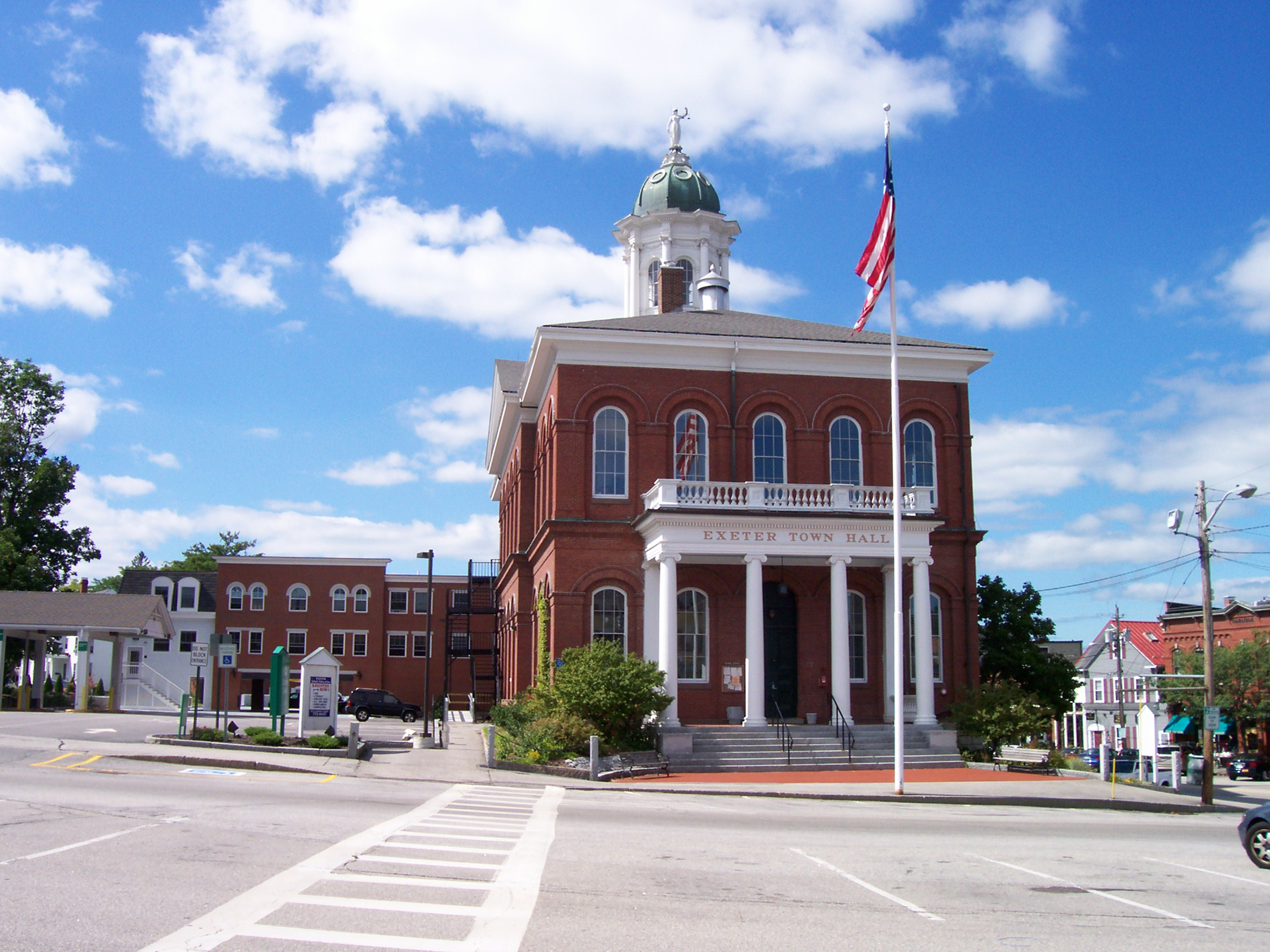
Exeter Town Hall, September 2008

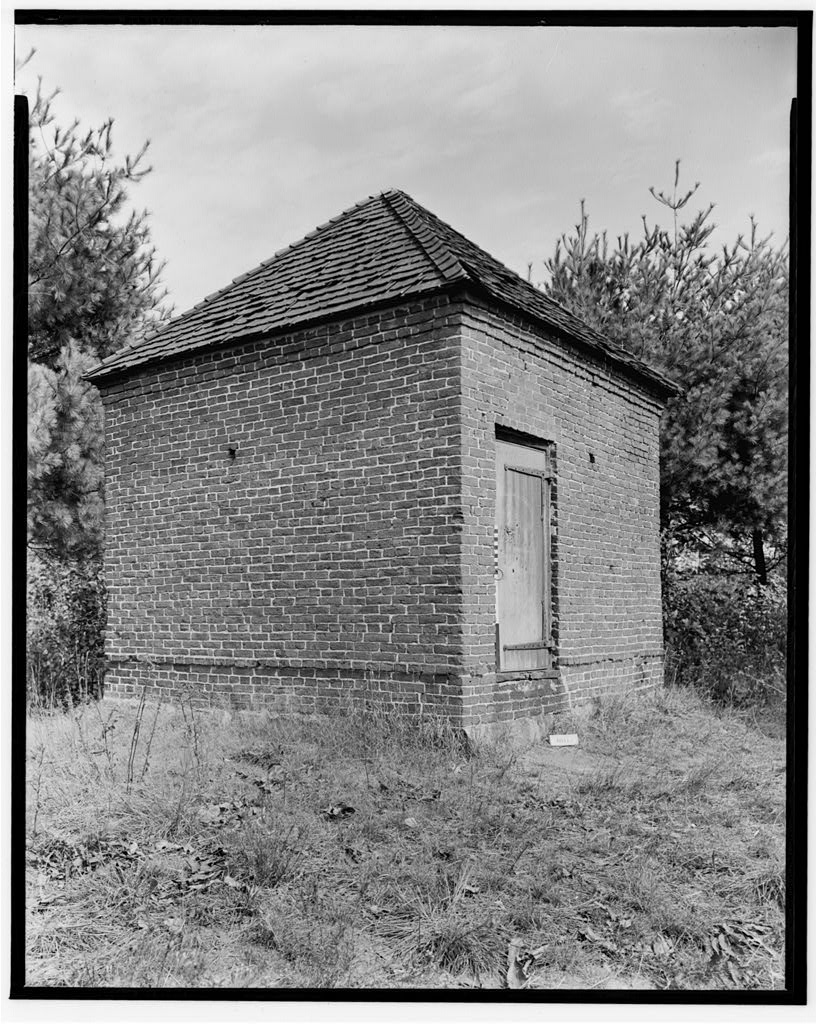
Powder House, 1936

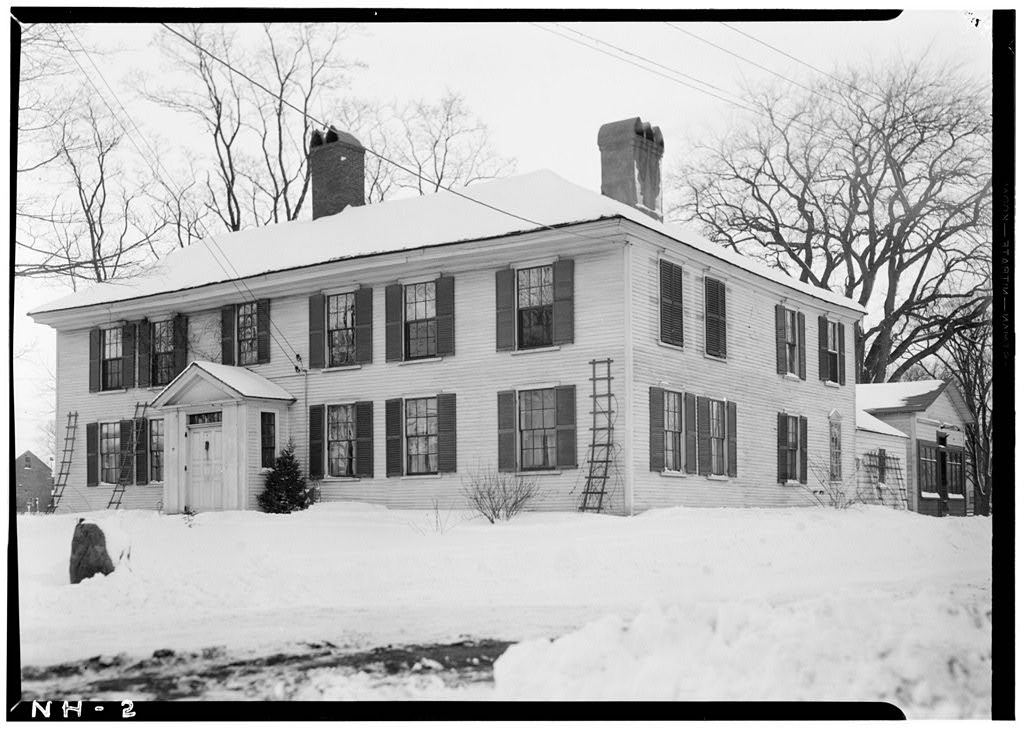
Giddings Tavern, 1935

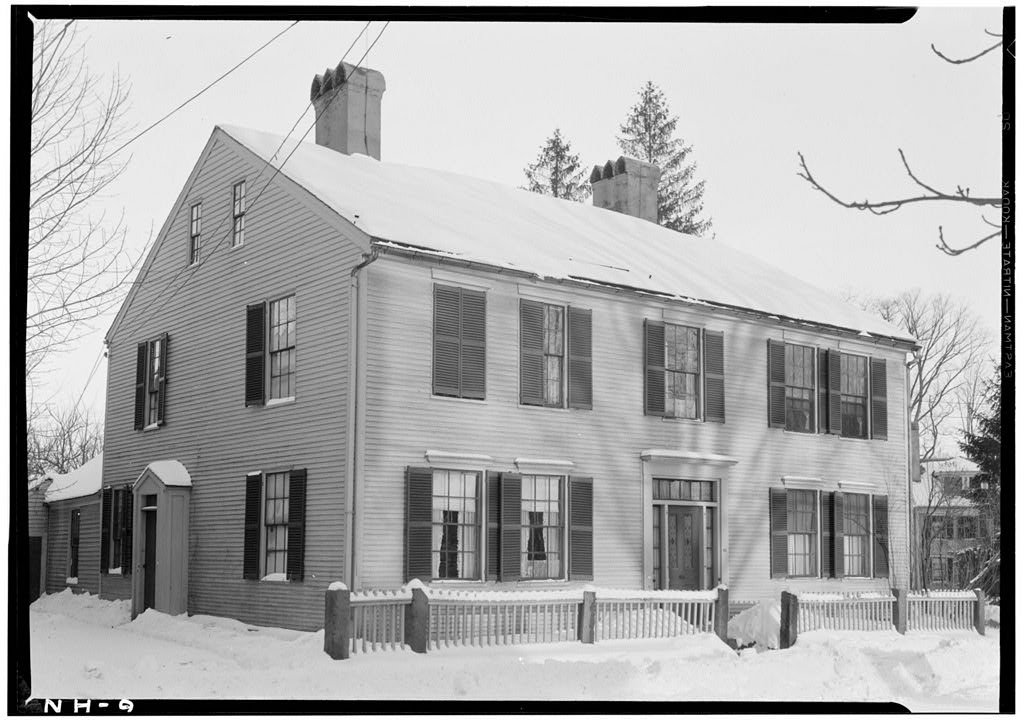
Liberty Emery House, 1935

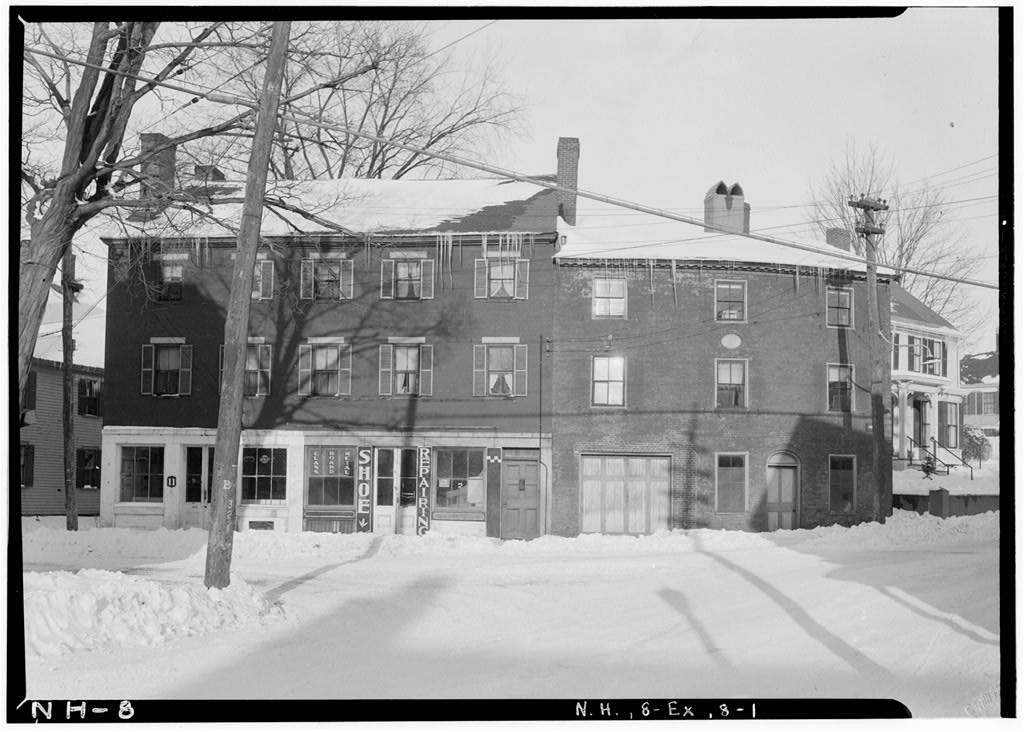
Simeon Folsom House, 1935

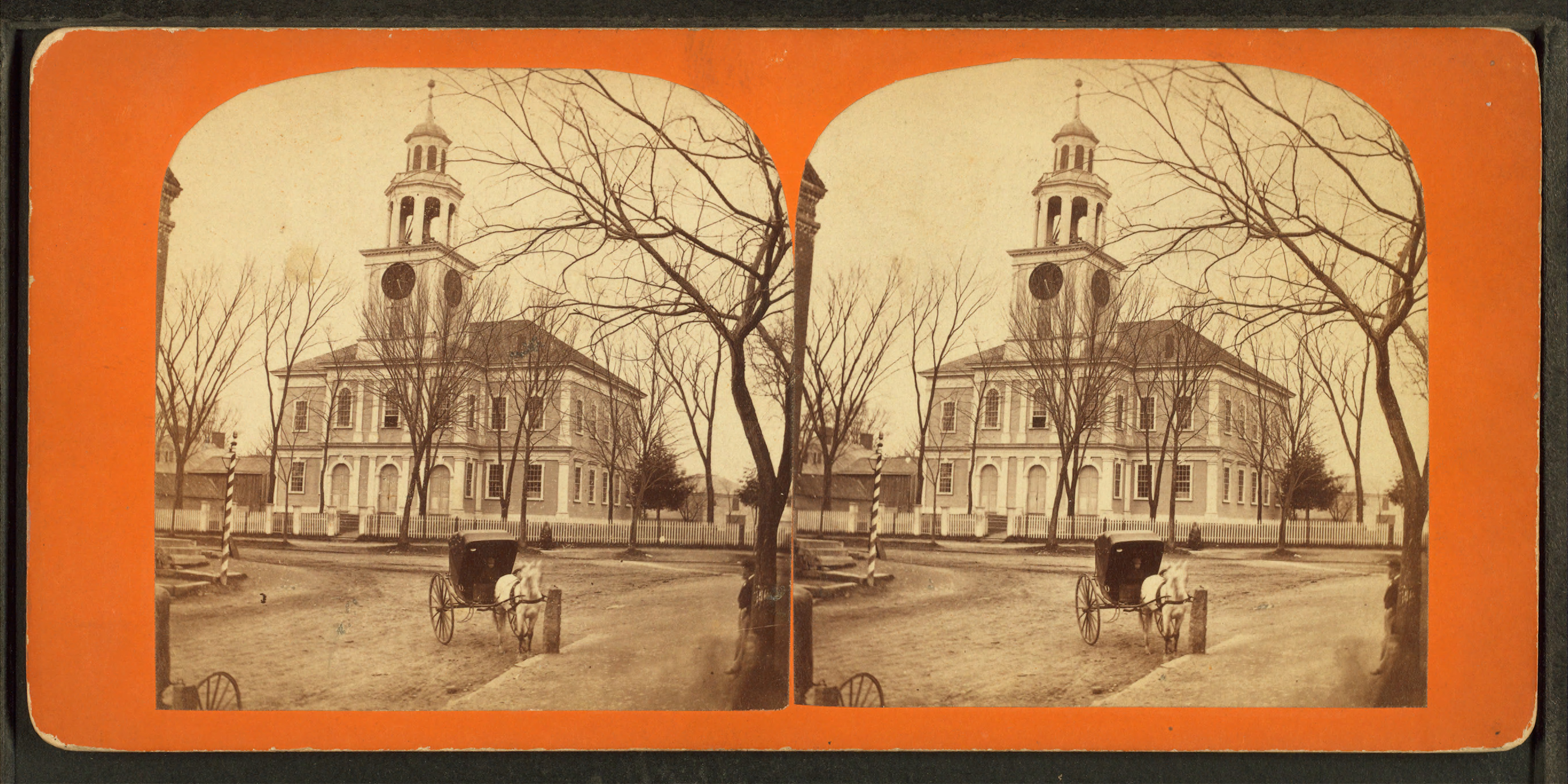
First Congregational Church, c. 1870

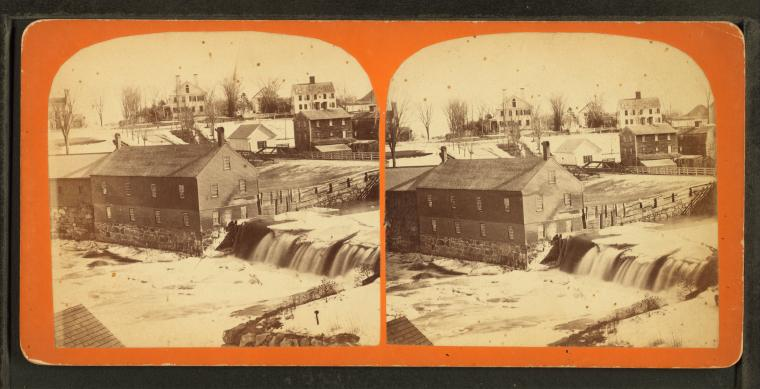
Lower falls in winter, c. 1870

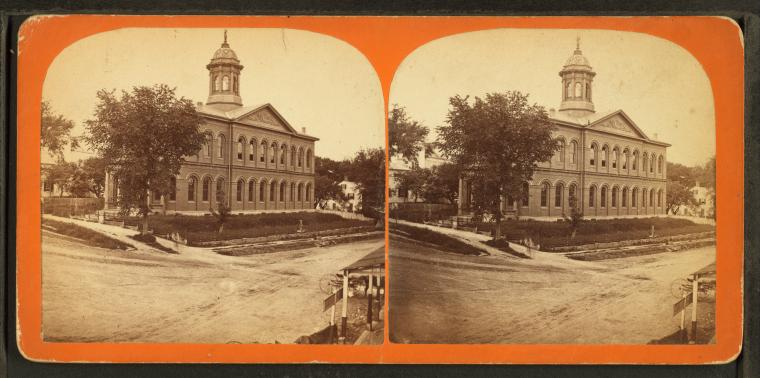
Town Hall, c. 1870

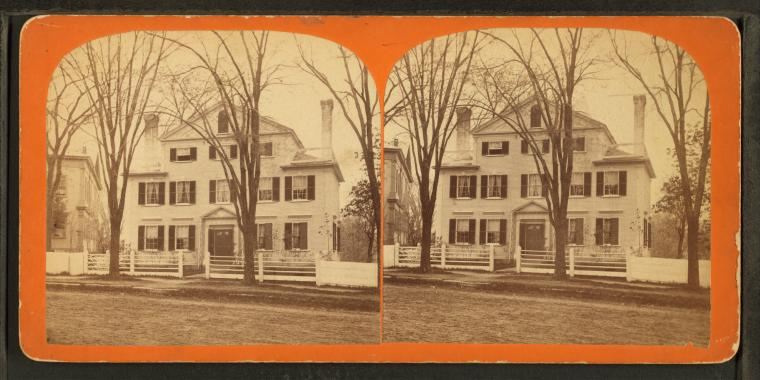
Bellows House, Front Street, c. 1870

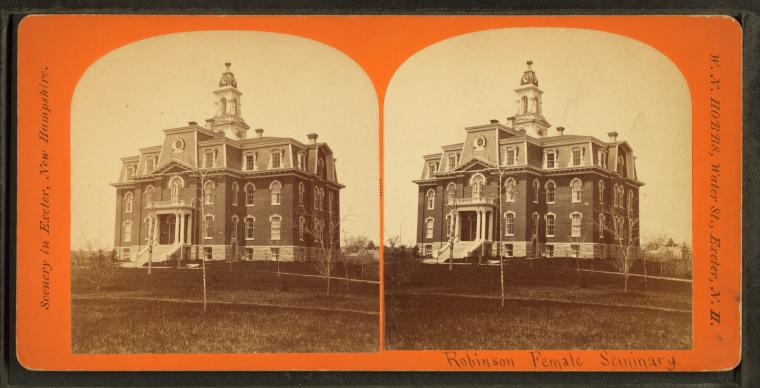
Robinson Female Seminary, now defunct, c. 1870

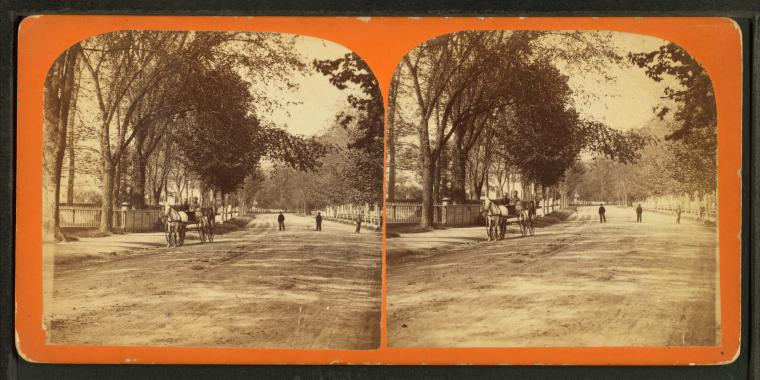
Front Street, c. 1870

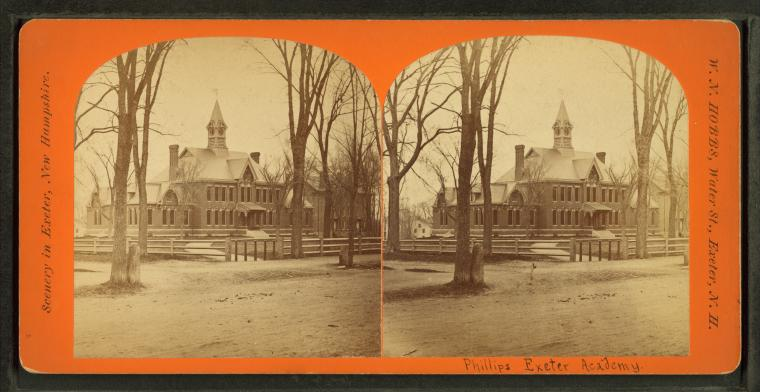
Phillips Exeter Academy, c. 1870

== Geography and wildlife ==
According to the United States Census Bureau, the town has an area of 20.0 square miles (51.7 km^{2}), of which 19.6 square miles (50.8 km^{2}) are land and 0.3 square miles (0.9 km^{2}) is covered by water, comprising 1.80% of the town. Exeter is drained by the Exeter River, which feeds the tidal Squamscott River in the center of town. Exeter's highest point is 250 feet (76 m) above sea level, on Great Hill at the town's southwestern corner. Exeter lies fully within the Piscataqua River (Coastal) watershed.

=== Rivers ===
In 2005, the small herring-like alewife fish was present in the Exeter River, though its numbers were fewer than in previous years. Local accounts suggest that the average length of the alewife was six inches. At this point in time the Exeter River was dammed in downtown Exeter, and a fish ladder would occasionally have a visible chad, lamprey eel, or trout.

Water from the small freshwater Dearborn Brook is stored in the Exeter Reservoir to support municipal drinking water system. A 2005 plan to manage Dearborn Brook was submitted by the Rockingham Planning Commission through the Clean Water Act. Dearborn Brook is a freshwater tributary to the tidal Squamscott River.

In fall 2015, the majority of the rivers in Exeter were impaired from stormwater and snowmelt-driven runoff pollutants, including large portions of Exeter River and Squamscott River, Dudley Brook, Little River, and Piscassic River.

In 2016, the Great Dam that had separated the Exeter River and the Squamscott River was removed. The removal of the dam and the fish ladder caused the alewife population to rebound, with over 100,000 fish as compared to 1,628 in 1970 and 15,626 in 1981. Hawks and eagles have been observed hunting the fish.

=== Trees ===
A 2017 town survey found that most human-planted trees in the urban areas of Exeter are broadleaf deciduous. Some significant species include Norway maples, red maple, oak, sugar maples, hedge maples, and ash.

Exeter also maintains a list of approved trees for planting, which include 30 trees native to the area, four trees native to the Eastern U.S., and 27 non-native species. Native trees include red maple, sugar maple, Freeman maple, serviceberry or juneberry, river birch, American hornbeam, hackberry, common hackberry, pagoda dogwood, flowering dogwood, hawthorn, American beech, eastern red cedar, black gum, ironwood, white spruce (picea alba), pitch pine, white pine, American sycamore, pin cherry, white oak, swamp white oak, scarlet oak, bur oak, red oak, black willow, sassafras, American mountain ash (sorbus americana "dwarfcrown"), American linden, and American elm.

=== Wildlife ===
Exeter contains the publicly-owned 235 acre Conner Farm Wildlife Management Area. This area contains about 90 acres of open fields, as well as upland forests of red oak, white oak, hemlock, and white pine. There are also black cherry, hickory, hop hornbeam, aspen, and birch trees. Additionally, there is a small freshwater marsh, a stream, and beaver ponds. Animals include deer, turkey, and migratory waterfowl.

=== Adjacent municipalities ===
- Newfields (north)
- Stratham (east)
- Hampton (southeast)
- Hampton Falls (southeast)
- Kensington (south)
- East Kingston (southwest)
- Kingston (southwest)
- Brentwood (west)
- Epping (northwest)

== Demographics ==
Historical population
Census	Pop.	Note	%±
1790	1,722		—
1800	1,727		0.3%
1810	1,759		1.9%
1820	2,114		20.2%
1830	2,759		30.5%
1840	2,925		6.0%
1850	3,329		13.8%
1860	3,309		−0.6%
1870	3,347		1.1%
1880	3,569		6.6%
1890	4,284		20.0%
1900	4,922		14.9%
1910	4,897		−0.5%
1920	4,604		−6.0%
1930	4,872		5.8%
1940	5,398		10.8%
1950	5,664		4.9%
1960	7,243		27.9%
1970	8,892		22.8%
1980	11,024		24.0%
1990	12,481		13.2%
2000	14,058		12.6%
2010	14,306		1.8%
2020	16,049		12.2%
U.S. Decennial Census

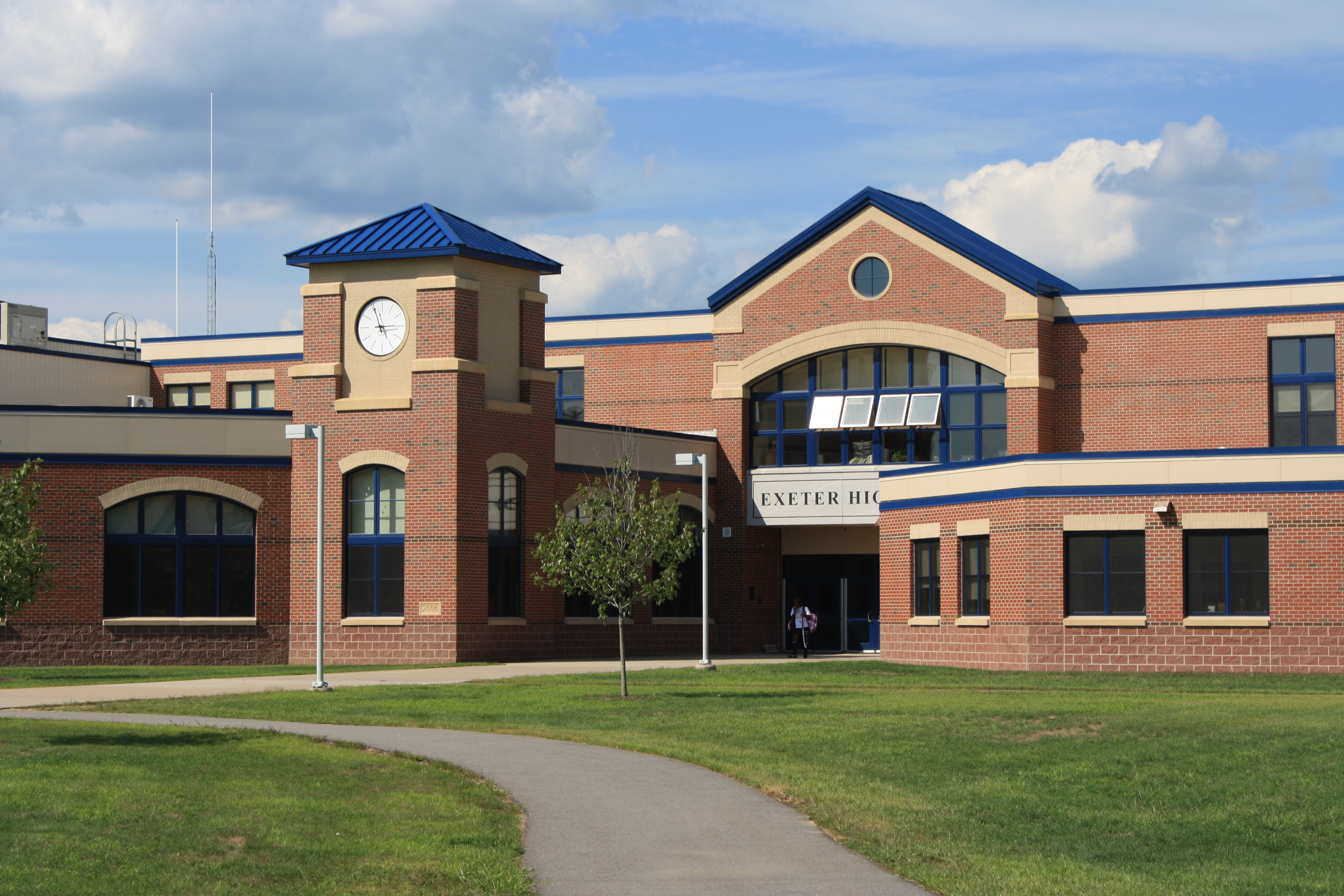
Exeter High School

As of the 2010 census, there were 14,306 people, 6,114 households, and 3,729 families residing in the town. The population density was 729.9 inhabitants per square mile (281.8/km^{2}). The 6,496 housing units had an average density of 331.4 per square mile (128.0/km^{2}). The racial makeup of the town was 95.5% White, 0.6% African American, 0.1% Native American, 2.0% Asian, 0.2% some other race, and 1.6% from two or more races. Hispanics or Latinos of any race were 1.77% of the population.

Of the 6,114 households, 29.1% had children under 18 living with them, 47.5% were headed by married couples living together, 9.8% had a female householder with no husband present, and 39.0% were not families. 32.5% of all households were made up of individuals, and 15.2% were someone living alone who was 65 or older. The average household size was 2.28, and the average family size was 2.92.

In the town, the age distribution of the population was 22.6% under 18, 6.0% from 18 to 24, 22.5% from 25 to 44, 30.8% from 45 to 64, and 18.2% who were 65 or older. The median age was 44.3 years. For every 100 females, there were 88.6 males. For every 100 females 18 and over, there were 84.9 males.

For the period 2007–2011, the estimated median annual income for a household in the town was $68,777, and for a family was $95,435. Male full-time workers had a median income of $64,632 versus $41,088 for females. The per capita income for the town was $38,018. About 2.5% of families and 5.7% of the population were below the poverty line, including 7.2% of those under 18 and 4.1% of those 65 or over.

== Government and politics ==
Exeter town presidential vote
Year	Democratic	Republican	Third parties
2024	65.1% 6,782	32.5% 3,385	1.1% 114
2020	66.3% 6,820	32.3% 3,321	1.4% 148
2016	59.6% 5,514	35.5% 3,286	4.9% 445
2012	58.2% 5,194	40.5% 3,614	0.8% 75
2008	60.5% 5,258	38.7% 3,365	0.8% 71

Exeter is located in New Hampshire's 1st congressional district, represented by Democrat Chris Pappas (D-Manchester). In the New Hampshire Senate, Exeter is located within New Hampshire's 24th State Senate district, represented by Democrat Debra Altschiller (D-Stratham).

In the New Hampshire House of Representatives, Exeter has two districts covering the town. Rockingham 11 is a district with four seats covering just the town of Exeter; it is currently represented by four Democrats: Julie D. Gilman, Gaby M. Grossman, Linda J. Haskins, and Mark Paige. Exeter also shares Rockingham 33, a single-member district, with the several other nearby towns; it is represented by Democrat Alexis H. Simpson (D-Exeter).

Like much of eastern Rockingham County, Exeter is strongly Democratic.

== Transportation ==
The Amtrak Downeaster stops at Exeter, providing passenger rail service to Portland and Boston.

Exeter is served by four exits (9–12) from Route 101, and Interstate 95 is about 5 miles (8 km) to the east. Routes 27, 85, 108, 111, and 111A meet at the town's center, and Route 88 is on the east side of the town.

== Economy ==
In 1990, the SIGARMS, Inc. company moved to Exeter. When it was bought by Michael Lüke and Thomas Ortmeier in October 2000, the name was changed to SIG Sauer Inc. Today, SIG Sauer is one of the world's largest firearms manufacturing entities.

Bauer Hockey's global headquarters is in Exeter.

== Sites of interest ==
- American Independence Museum
- Congregational Church in Exeter, founded 1638
- Exeter Historical Society and Museum
- Phillips Exeter Academy

== See also ==
- List of newspapers in New Hampshire: Exeter
- Exeter Inn
