= Brentwood, New Hampshire =

Place in New Hampshire, United States

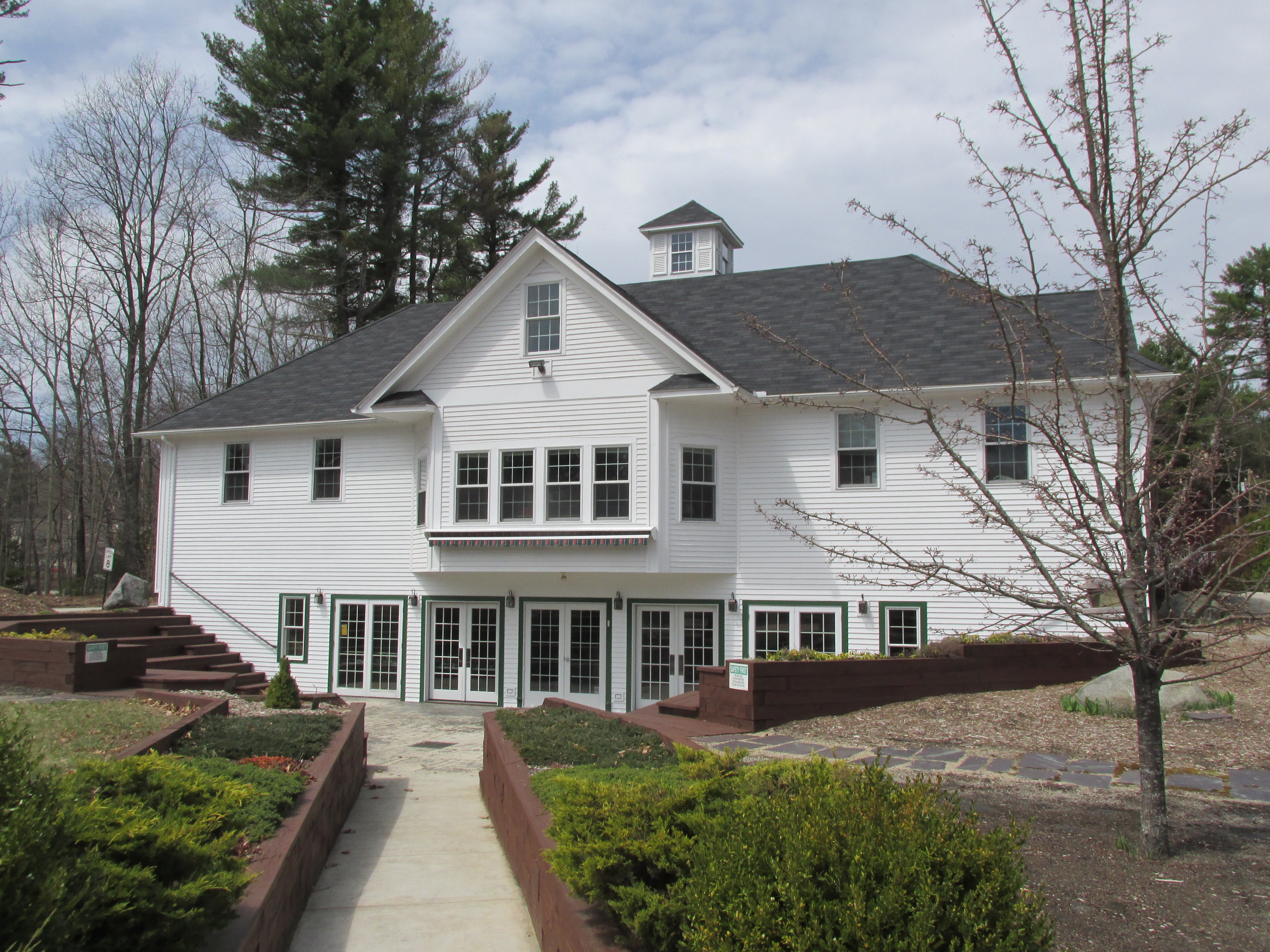
- Mary E. Bartlett Library

- Seal

- Location in Rockingham County and the state of New Hampshire.
- Coordinates: 42°59′35″N 71°01′22″W
- Country: United States
- State: New Hampshire
- County: Rockingham
- Incorporated: 1742
- Named for: Brentwood, Essex
- Villages: Brentwood; Brentwood Corners; Marshall Corner

Area
  - Total: 17.0 sq mi (44.0 km^{2})
  - Land: 16.8 sq mi (43.6 km^{2})
  - Water: 0.15 sq mi (0.4 km^{2}) 0.93%
- Elevation: 118 ft (36 m)

Population (2020)
  - Total: 4,490
  - Density: 267/sq mi (103.1/km^{2})
- Time zone: UTC-5 (Eastern)
  - Summer (DST): UTC-4 (Eastern)
- ZIP code: 03833
- Area code: 603
- FIPS code: 33-07220
- GNIS feature ID: 873550
- Website: www.brentwoodnh.gov

Brentwood is a town in, and the county seat of, Rockingham County, New Hampshire, United States. At the 2020 census, its population was 4,490.

== History ==
An Abenaki tribe called the Pennacook farmed, fished and hunted in what is now Brentwood. Two main foot trails ran through the town, one along the Exeter River, where arrowheads and other stone and wooden artifacts have been found. At Pickpocket Dam, this pathway joined with the Pentucket Trail leading south to Pentucket (now Haverhill, Massachusetts) and north further into Pennacook territory.

The first non-native settlers came in 1652 to start a sawmill powered by a waterfall on the Exeter River.

=== Division and redivision ===
The town was once a part of Exeter known as Brentwood (or Brintwood) Parish. It was named after Brentwood, Essex, originally called "Burnt Wood", where, in 1177, King Henry II granted permission for 40 acres (160,000 m^{2}) of the king's forest to be cut, burned and cultivated.

Beginning in 1738, residents living in the southwestern portion of Exeter, now Brentwood and Fremont, petitioned to be set off, but were denied. They cited difficulty of getting to the Exeter church/meetinghouse, where weekly attendance was obligatory, and the requirement to pay Exeter taxes. Eighteen people wrote in dissent, saying that even the proposed new town would require travel more than two miles to a new meetinghouse. On June 26, 1742, colonial governor Benning Wentworth set Brentwood off from Exeter and incorporated it.

The meetinghouse was planned at "the west side of the 'Gully'", but those living south of the Exeter River said it was hard to reach in spring and fall. For a while, church was held at two venues, north and south of the river.

Residents petitioned for a dividing line between the midpoints of the northern and southern boundaries. In 1744, Gov. Wentworth issued a King's Patent to establish a new town called "Keeneborough Parish", named after his friend, Sir Benjamin Keene (1697–1757), English minister to Spain. Brentwood continued to tax the residents of Keeneborough; one resident was imprisoned for failing to pay, and the General Assembly called Wentworth's action a "usurpation." Minister Nathaniel Trask reconciled the factions and Keeneborough reunited with Brentwood in 1750. The westerners petitioned again for separation in 1757 and 1763. In 1764, Brentwood did divide, the western half calling itself "Poplin" (now Fremont).

After Rev. Trask's death in 1789, the Congregationalists lamented the decline of religion and morality in favor of alcohol. The town licensed its first "dram shop" in 1792 and licensed 28 of them over eleven years. A handful of slaves were held in Brentwood, but none at the 1800 or subsequent censuses.

=== Development ===
Mills along the rivers produced lumber and manufactured goods in the early days. The economy later shifted towards agriculture. The town is now predominantly residential.

The Rockingham County Complex on North Road (the only road owned by the county) traces its history to 1916. It was called the "poor farm" or the "county farm", but the only current farming is hay. It has administrative offices, a nursing home, and the county jail. In 1997, when county offices and courts moved from the Exeter courthouse to a former industrial headquarters off Calef Road, Brentwood became the county seat.

Retail development is focused along Calef Road, though home businesses exist elsewhere for historical reasons. There is an industrial zone in the northeast, along Pine Road, which spans Brentwood and Exeter. In 2012, Exeter, resenting the wear on its part of the road from heavy vehicles from the businesses in Brentwood, posted a weight limit on its part, which led to lengthy detours and a lawsuit and counter-suit. These were settled in 2014, as the judge ruled that Exeter's posting was illegal. Brentwood had to reimburse Exeter, but only the amounts for upgrading Pine Road to handle the heavy vehicles.

The 2014 fatal shooting of police officer Stephen Arkell, who arrived at a condominium to investigate a domestic disturbance, led to many memorials and continuing events in his name, such as an annual 5K run. In 2021, the section of Route 125 within Brentwood was officially named the Officer Stephen Arkell Memorial Highway.

== Geography ==
Brentwood is a nearly square quadrangle, except that the town line follows the Exeter River in the southeastern corner. Brentwood has a total area of 17.0 square miles (44.0 km^{2}), of which 16.8 square miles (43.6 km^{2}) are land and 0.2 square miles (0.4 km^{2}) are water, comprising 0.93% of the town. The highest point in Brentwood is Great Hill, at 275 feet (84 m) above sea level, whose summit is in the southeastern corner of the town.

The town is drained by the Exeter River and its tributary Dudley Brook. The Piscassic River, a tributary of the Lamprey River, crosses the northwestern corner of the town. Brentwood lies fully within the Piscataqua River (Coastal) watershed.

== Transportation ==
exits serving Brentwood
Exit 7	(Calef Road)
Exit 8	North Road to

Middle Road (Route 111A) runs east/west and bisects the town. Other east–west roads are North Road and South Road. Calef Road (Route 125) is the principal north–south road.

The expressway Route 101 approximately follows Brentwood's northern boundary. It provides access to Manchester and to the Seacoast. Route 101 crosses into northeast Brentwood, as does Route 27 (old 101) beyond it. Part of New England Dragway is in Brentwood.

Route 111A east to Exeter gains access to Route 7 of the COAST bus system, and to a train station served by the Amtrak Downeaster. At the park and ride lot off Calef Road just north of Brentwood, there is bus service to Boston, Massachusetts and its Logan Airport. Shuttle bus service can be arranged to Manchester Boston Regional Airport.

== Demographics ==
Historical population
Census	Pop.	Note	%±
1790	976		—
1800	899		−7.9%
1810	905		0.7%
1820	892		−1.4%
1830	891		−0.1%
1840	888		−0.3%
1850	923		3.9%
1860	887		−3.9%
1870	895		0.9%
1880	999		11.6%
1890	967		−3.2%
1900	957		−1.0%
1910	759		−20.7%
1920	685		−9.7%
1930	725		5.8%
1940	720		−0.7%
1950	819		13.8%
1960	1,072		30.9%
1970	1,468		36.9%
1980	2,004		36.5%
1990	2,590		29.2%
2000	3,197		23.4%
2010	4,486		40.3%
2020	4,490		0.1%
U.S. Decennial Census

As of the census of 2010, there were 4,486 people, 1,319 households, and 1,087 families residing in the town. The population density was 267.0 inhabitants per square mile (103.1/km^{2}). There were 1,350 housing units at an average density of 80.4 per square mile (31.0/km^{2}). The racial makeup of the town was 96.3% White, 0.7% African American, 0.1% Native American, 1.0% Asian, 0.1% Pacific Islander, 0.5% some other race, and 1.3% from two or more races. Hispanic or Latino of any race were 1.5% of the population.

There were 1,319 households, out of which 46.2% had children under the age of 18 living with them, 71.6% were headed by married couples living together, 7.1% had a female householder with no husband present, and 17.6% were non-families. 14.0% of all households were made up of individuals, and 5.9% were someone living alone who was 65 years of age or older. The average household size was 3.02, and the average family size was 3.33.

In the town, the population was spread out, with 26.6% under the age of 18, 7.2% from 18 to 24, 24.0% from 25 to 44, 28.8% from 45 to 64, and 13.4% who were 65 years of age or older. The median age was 41.1 years. For every 100 females, there were 106.1 males. For every 100 females age 18 and over, there were 106.6 males.

For the period 2007–2011, the estimated median annual income for a household in the town was $110,250, and the median income for a family was $111,650. Male full-time workers had a median income of $69,565 versus $55,000 for females. The per capita income for the town was $37,385. About 1.0% of families and 2.2% of the population were below the poverty line, including 3.2% of those under age 18 and 0.4% of those age 65 or over.

== Government ==
Brentwood's executive is a five-person Selectboard, serving staggered three-year terms and meeting weekly (biweekly in spring and summer). Brentwood's legislature is a town meeting, held in March, at which every registered voter can amend and vote on the annual town budget and other warrant articles. The Swasey Elementary School has a separate town meeting. Classes above Grade 6 travel to regional schools in School Administrative Unit (SAU) 16.

SAU 16 is governed by official ballot referendum (SB 2), in which there is a "deliberative" town meeting but the final vote is by secret ballot in all participating towns, at the same annual election at which voters elect town and school officials. Every town in SAU 16 votes on the representative(s) of it and of all other towns in SAU 16.

Starting in 2027, Brentwood's municipal town meeting will also use the official ballot referendum. Governance of Swasey School will still be by traditional town meeting.

Since 2025, the municipal budget is capped at 4% growth above the prior year, not adjusted for inflation or population change.

== Religion ==
The original church, on Route 111A, is now known as the Pilgrim United Church of Christ, Brentwood-Kingston. In addition, Brentwood First Baptist Church has been at the same location since 1771. Grace Ministries holds religious services and a Christian grade school in a former industrial building on Calef Road. There is also a Kingdom Hall of Jehovah's Witnesses, which has two congregations.

== Notable people ==
- Ted King (born 1983), professional cyclist
- Joshua Smith (1760–1795), author, minister
- William Morrill Wadley (1813–1882), railroad superintendent
