= Centennial (disambiguation) =

Centennial is of or relating to a century, a period of 100 years.

Centennial may also refer to:

== Entertainment ==
- Centennial (novel), a 1974 novel by James Michener
  - Centennial (miniseries), a 1978 television miniseries based on the Michener novel
- Centennial (comics), a character featured in Marvel Comics
- Centennial (album), a 1984 instrumental album by John Stewart

== Places ==
=== Australia ===
- Centennial Parklands, three parklands in the eastern suburbs of Sydney

=== Canada ===
- Centennial, Moncton, New Brunswick
- Centennial, Winnipeg, Manitoba
- Centennial Lake (Algoma District), Ontario
- Centennial Lake (Renfrew County), Ontario

=== United States ===
- Centennial, California, a proposed planned community in Los Angeles County
- Centennial, Colorado, a home rule municipality near Denver
- Centennial, Indiana, an unincorporated community
- Centennial, Michigan, an unincorporated community
- Centennial Heights, Michigan, an unincorporated community
- Centennial, Portland, Oregon, a city neighborhood
- Centennial, West Virginia, an unincorporated community
- Centennial, Wyoming, a census-designated place
- Centennial Mountains, Idaho and Montana
- Centennial District (Philadelphia), a neighborhood
- Centennial Neighborhood District, Lafayette, Indiana
- Lake Centennial (Maryland), a man-made reservoir

=== Multiple countries ===
- Centennial Park (disambiguation)

== Businesses ==
- Centennial Airlines, an airline based in Wyoming from 1981 to 1987
- Centennial Airlines (Spain)
- Centennial Communications, a US-based telecommunications corporation

== Education ==
- Centennial Campus of North Carolina State University, a research park and educational campus in Raleigh, North Carolina
  - Centennial Biomedical Campus of North Carolina State University
- Centennial College, Scarborough, Ontario, Canada
- Centennial School District (disambiguation), various districts in the United States
- Centennial High School (disambiguation), various schools in the United States and Canada
- Centennial Collegiate, Saskatoon, Saskatchewan, Canada, a high school
- Centennial Secondary School (disambiguation), various schools in Canada

== Sports ==
- Ayr Centennials, a junior ice hockey team
- Calgary Centennials, a junior ice hockey team
- Merritt Centennials, a junior ice hockey team
- Nashville Centennials, a minor league baseball team
- North Bay Centennials, a junior ice hockey team
- Philadelphia Centennials, a major league baseball team
- Centennial Conference, in the NCAA Division III

== Transportation ==
- Centennial Parkway, an arterial road in Hamilton, Ontario, Canada
- Centennial GO Station, a station in the GO Transit network located in Markham, Ontario, Canada
- Centennial Class, a class of Union Pacific EMD DDA40X diesel locomotives

== Other ==
- Centennial Airport, the second-busiest American general aviation airport, located near Denver, Colorado
- Centennial Baptist Church, Helena, Arkansas, on the National Register of Historic Places
- Centennial comfort stations, restrooms built in 1876 in Philadelphia
- Centennial Exposition, the first world's fair held in America, in Philadelphia in 1876
- Centennial Fountain (disambiguation)
- Centennial Hall (disambiguation)
- Centennial Park (disambiguation)
- Centennial Tower (disambiguation)
- Alfred "Centennial" Johnson (1846–1927), Danish-born American fisherman who made the first recorded single-handed crossing of the Atlantic Ocean in honor of the first centennial of the United States
- Smith & Wesson Centennial, a model group of snub-nosed revolvers
- A Canadian barley cultivar
- An American variety of hops
- An alternative term for Generation Z

== See also ==
- Anniversary
- Century (disambiguation)
- Centenary (disambiguation)
- Centenario (disambiguation)
- Centennial Discovery
