= Centennial Lake =

Centennial Lake may refer to one of two lakes in Ontario, Canada:

- Centennial Lake (Algoma District)
- Centennial Lake (Renfrew County)
  - Centennial Lake Provincial Nature Reserve

== See also ==
- Lake Centennial (Maryland)
- Centennial Lakes Park (Minnesota)
- Centennial (disambiguation)
