= Centennial Park =

Centennial Park may refer to:

== Australia ==
- Centennial Park Cemetery, Pasadena and Adelaide, South Australia
- Centennial Park (Sydney)
- Centennial Park, New South Wales, a suburb of Sydney named for the park
- Centennial Park, Western Australia, a suburb of the city of Albany

== Canada ==
- Centennial Park (Moncton), New Brunswick
- Centennial Park (Thunder Bay), Ontario
- Centennial Park (Toronto), either of two parks in Ontario, Canada

== New Zealand ==
- Centennial Park, Christchurch, a sports park
- Centennial Park, Ngaruawahia, a sports venue
- Centennial Park, Oamaru, a sports venue
- Memorial Park, Tauranga, previously Centennial Park

== Philippines ==
- Baguio Botanical Garden, also known as Centennial Park

== United States ==
- Centennial Park, Arizona, a hamlet in Mohave County; home to fundamentalist Mormon polygamists
- Centennial Olympic Park, Atlanta, Georgia
- Centennial Park (Champaign, Illinois)
- Centennial Park (Davenport, Iowa)
- Centennial Park (Ellicott City), Maryland
- Centennial Grounds, home park for the 1875 Philadelphia Centennials baseball team in Pennsylvania
- Centennial Park (Nashville), Tennessee
- Centennial Park, a waterfront park connected to Myrtle Edwards Park in Seattle, Washington
- Centennial Park (Chicago), a city park maintained by the Chicago Park District.

== In fiction ==
- Centennial Park, a fictitious park in Metropolis in the Superman mythos
