= Dominic Parolin =

Canadian basketball player

No. 9 – Eisbären Bremerhaven
- Position: Power forward
- League: ProA

Personal information
- Born: December 14, 2002 (age 23) Coquitlam, British Columbia, Canada
- Listed height: 6 ft 9 in (2.06 m)
- Listed weight: 245 lb (111 kg)

Career information
- High school: Centennial Secondary (Coquitlam, British Columbia)
- College: Lehigh (2020–2024); Boise State (2024–2026)
- Playing career: 2026–present

Career history
- 2026: Vancouver Bandits
- 2026–present: Eisbären Bremerhaven

Career highlights
- Third Team All-Patriot League (2024); Patriot League All-Academic Team (2024)

Dominic Parolin (born December 14, 2002) is a Canadian professional basketball player for Eisbären Bremerhaven of the German ProA. He played college basketball for the Lehigh Mountain Hawks and Boise State Broncos.

== High school career ==
Parolin attended Centennial Secondary School from 2016 to 2020. In his senior year in 2020, he was named an all-star at the British Columbia 4A High School Boys Basketball Championships

== College career ==
Parolin played college basketball for the Lehigh Mountain Hawks and Boise State Broncos. In 137 career games, he totalled 969 points, 629 rebounds, 126 assists, 82 steals and 76 blocks.

During the 2023–24 season, while at Lehigh, Parolin averaged 11.5 points, 6.3 rebounds, 1.6 assists, 0.7 blocks and was named Third Team All-Patriot League and All-Academic Team.

== Professional career ==
=== Vancouver Bandits (2026) ===
On April 2, 2026, Parolin signed with the Vancouver Bandits of the Canadian Elite Basketball League.

=== Eisbären Bremerhaven (2026–present) ===
In July 2026, Parolin joined German club Eisbären Bremerhaven of the ProA league.
