= Little Boar's Head Historic District =

Historic district in New Hampshire, United States

- U.S. National Register of Historic Places
- U.S. Historic district
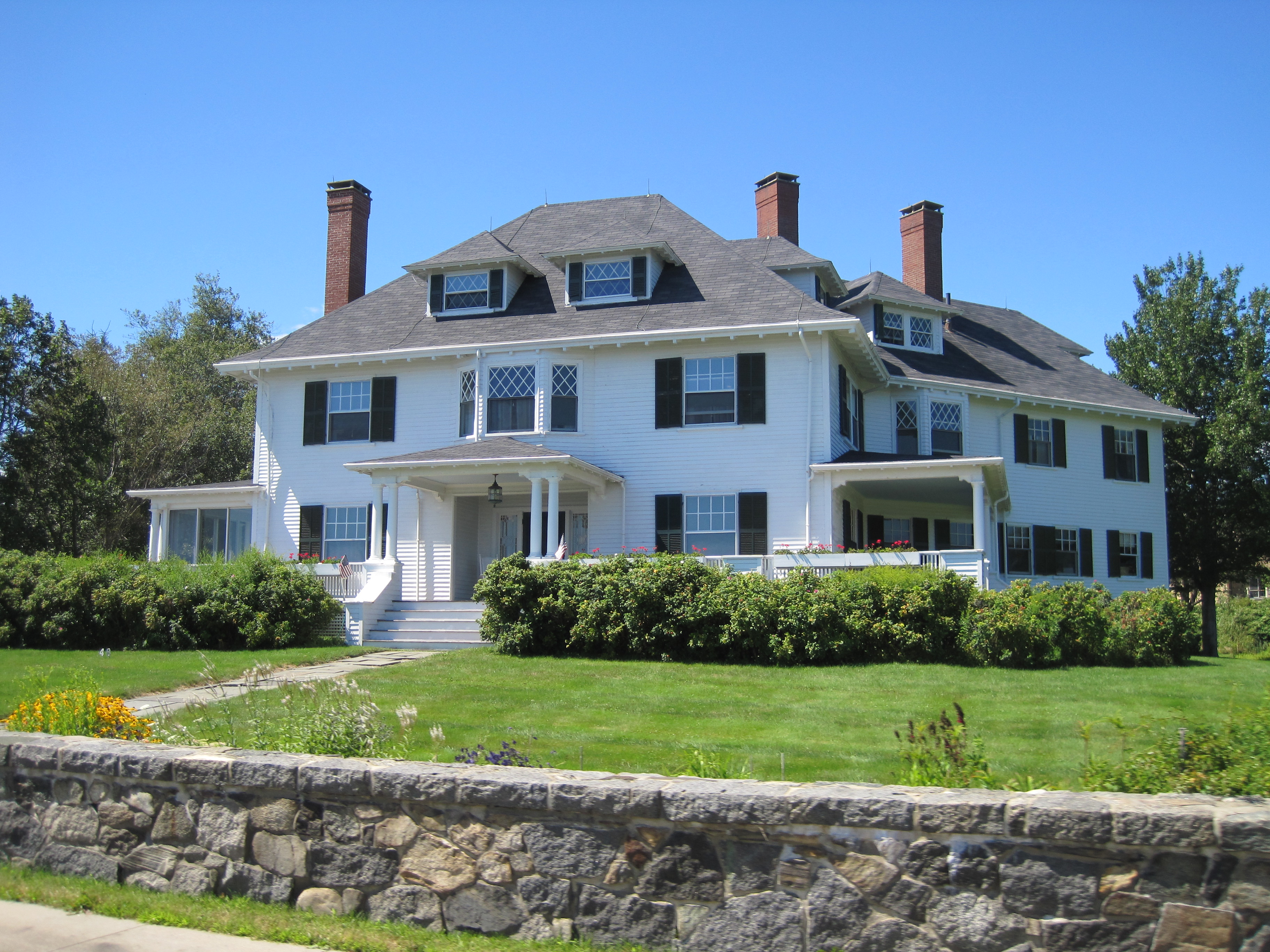
- The Bell-Sullivan House

- Location within New Hampshire Location within the United States
- Location: Parts of Atlantic Ave., Chapel Rd., Ocean Blvd., Sea Rd., and Willow Ave., North Hampton, New Hampshire
- Coordinates: 42°57′36″N 70°46′45″W
- Area: 150 acres (61 ha)
- Architect: Shepley, Rutan & Coolidge; et.al.
- Architectural style: Colonial Revival, Shingle Style
- NRHP reference No.: 99000668
- Added to NRHP: June 3, 1999

The Little Boar's Head Historic District encompasses an area of summer resort and beachfront properties in North Hampton, New Hampshire. Located on New Hampshire's seacoast roughly between North Hampton State Beach and Bass Beach, the district is almost entirely residential, consisting mainly of houses built as summer vacation spots in the late 19th and early 20th centuries, with associated beachfront amenities. The district was listed on the National Register of Historic Places in 1999.

== Description and history ==
Little Boar's Head is a glacial drumlin (low steep hill) on New Hampshire's coast overlooking the Gulf of Maine. The historic district extends along Ocean Boulevard (New Hampshire Route 1A), which runs along the beach, and includes properties on Sea Avenue, Atlantic Avenue, Willow Avenue, and Chapel Road. Its southern end is a cluster of bathhouses just south of North Hampton State Beach, northward to the southern end of Bass Beach. There are a few older houses, and the district includes the bathhouses along the beach as well as a series of fish houses located just north of the state beach.

Until the mid-19th century, the Little Boar's Head area was a sleepy fishing and agricultural community. In 1845 New Hampshire Senator James Bell purchased coastal land from a local farmer, and in 1862 built Bell's Cottage for his daughter as a summer house; now much enlarged, it stands at 4 Atlantic Avenue, and is the first of the summer properties to be built. Former President Franklin Pierce bought land in the 1860s, which was minimally developed before his death. In 1868 Bachelder's Hotel opened, and became a mainstay of the summer scene until its destruction by fire in 1929. Summer house development continued into the early 20th century, and the area's high-profile visitors included Presidents Chester A. Arthur, William Howard Taft, and Franklin Delano Roosevelt. Massachusetts Governor Alvan T. Fuller had a significant estate here, its house now demolished, in which he created Fuller Gardens, now a public garden managed by a nonprofit.

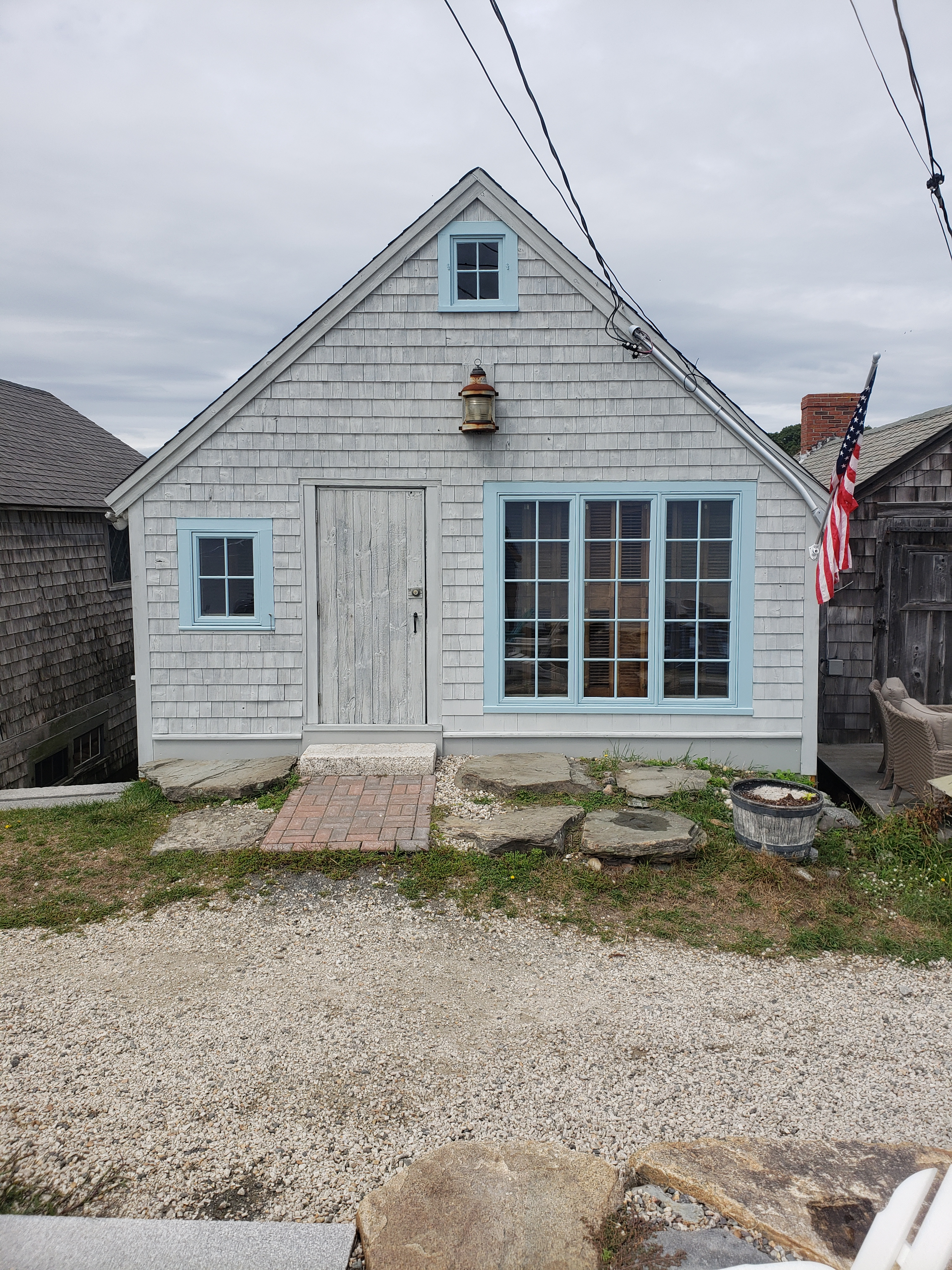
Historic fish house c.1870

== See also ==
- National Register of Historic Places listings in Rockingham County, New Hampshire
