= Centennial Fountain (disambiguation) =

Centennial Fountain is a fountain in Chicago.

The term may also refer to other fountains in the United States:

- Centennial Fountain (Oklahoma City)
- Centennial Fountain (Seattle University)
- The Catholic Total Abstinence Union Fountain in Philadelphia, commonly known as the Centennial Fountain

== See also ==
- Victoria Centennial Fountain
