= Centenario =

Centenario (Italian and Spanish) or Centenário (Portuguese) is an adjective meaning Centenary, and relating to a period of 100 years.

Centenario may refer to:

== Currency ==
- Centenario (coin), a Mexican gold coin

== Places ==
- Centenario, Neuquén, a village and municipality in Neuquén Province, Argentina
- Centenário, Rio Grande do Sul, a municipality in Rio Grande do Sul, Brazil
- Centenario, Tijuana, a borough in Baja California, Mexico
- Centenário, Tocantins, a municipality in Tocantins, Brazil
- Centenario, Uruguay, a town in Durazno, Uruguay
- Centenário do Sul, a municipality in Paraná, Brazil
- Centenario Bridge, Seville, Spain

== Sports ==
- Estadio Centenario, the football stadium of the first World Cup in Montevideo, Uruguay
- Estadio Centenario (Armenia, Colombia), a football stadium in Armenia, Colombia
- Estadio Centenario (Resistencia), a football stadium in Resistencia, Argentina
- Estádio Centenário, a football stadium in Caxias do Sul, Brazil

== Other uses ==
- Radio Centenario, a Uruguayan radio station
- Lamborghini Centenario, an Italian sports car

== See also ==
- Century (disambiguation)
- Centenary (disambiguation)
- Centennial (disambiguation)
