= Centennial Hall =

Centennial Hall (German: Jahrhunderthalle, Polish: Hala Stulecia) may refer to:

in Australia

- Sydney Town Hall, 1889
- Adelaide Showground, 1936, since demolished

in Canada

- Centennial Hall (London, Ontario), London, Ontario, Canada
- Centennial Concert Hall, Winnipeg, Manitoba, Canada
- Saskatoon Centennial Auditorium, former name of TCU Place

in Germany

- Jahrhunderthalle, Bochum, 1902
- Centennial Hall (Frankfurt) (Jahrhunderthalle), Frankfurt, 1963

in Poland

- Centennial Hall (Wrocław) (Hala Stulecia) (1913), Wrocław, Poland, a UNESCO World Heritage Site
- Centennial Hall (Sopot) (Hala Stulecia), Sopot, Poland

in the United States

- Centennial Hall (Tucson, Arizona), a concert venue
- Centennial Hall Convention Center, built in 1976, in Hayward, California
- Centennial Hall (Denver, Colorado), a Denver Landmark
- Centennial Hall-Edward Waters College, Jacksonville, Florida, listed on the National Register of Historic Places (NRHP)
- Centennial Hall (Valentine, Nebraska), NRHP-listed
- Centennial Hall (North Hampton, New Hampshire), community hall and historic schoolhouse, NRHP-listed
- Savage Arena, Toledo, Ohio, 1976, formerly known as "Centennial Hall"
- Lehi Ward Tithing Barn-Centennial Hall, Lehi, Utah, NRHP-listed
