= Drake Farm =

- U.S. National Register of Historic Places
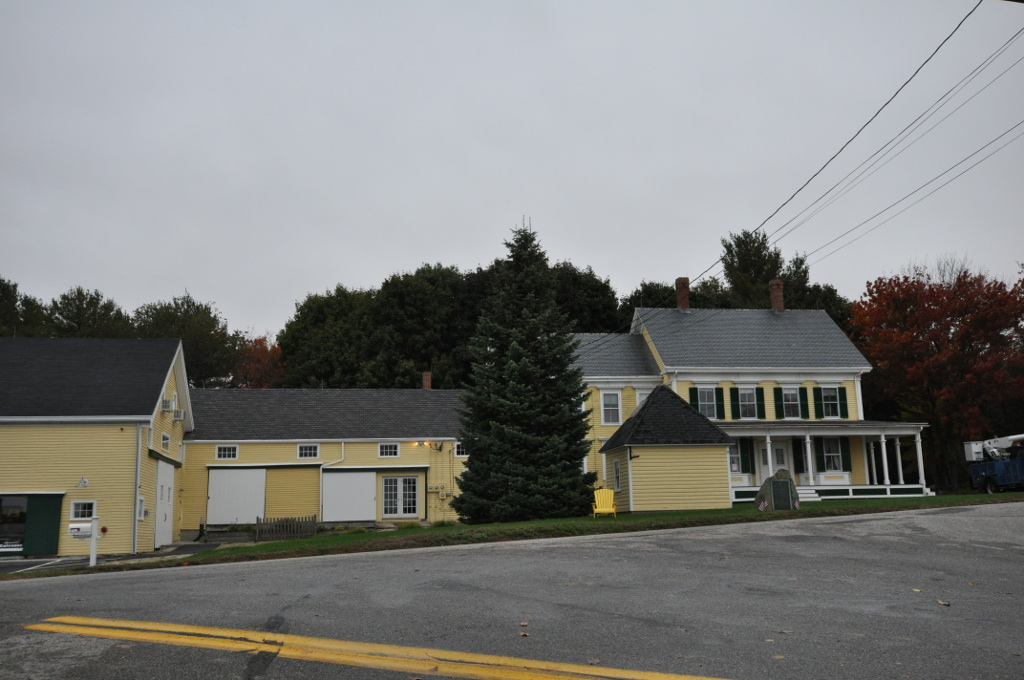

- Location within New Hampshire Location within the United States
- Location: 148 Lafayette Rd., North Hampton, New Hampshire
- Coordinates: 42°59′22″N 70°49′20″W
- Area: 10.88 acres (4.40 ha)
- Built: 1750
- NRHP reference No.: 16000645
- Added to NRHP: September 20, 2016

Drake Farm is a historic farmstead at 148 Lafayette Road in North Hampton, New Hampshire. Built in 1890, the main farmhouse is a well-preserved example of a connected New England farmstead. It was listed on the National Register of Historic Places in 2016.

== Description and history ==
Drake Farm is located in northern North Hampton, on the north side of Lafayette Road (U.S. Route 1) east of its junction with North Road. The property consists of about 11 acres (4.5 ha) of land, most of which is now forested. The farmstead is located near the road, with an intervening grassy area adorned by a small wellhouse and a boulder-mounted historical marker. The farmstead is a classic New England 19th-century connected farmstead, with a main house, two-story ell, "back barn", and main barn. The main house is 2-1/2 stories in height and four bays wide, with a side gable roof and single-story porch. The ell is also four bays wide, but narrower and more simply decorated. The main barn is a large rectangular structure with multiple bay entrances on the street-facing ground floor.

The property was first farmed in the early 18th century, when Abraham Drake built a house near where the wellhouse stands. That house was occupied by five generation of Drakes, including a soldier in the American Revolutionary War. The present main house block was either built here in 1889-90, or was moved here then from another location; internal evidence suggests it may have been built as early as 1870. The "back barn" connecting it to the main barn is of older construction. The house remained in the Drake family until 1986; the barn has been rehabilitated for commercial uses.

== See also ==
- National Register of Historic Places listings in Rockingham County, New Hampshire
