= Fuller Gardens =

Botanical garden in New Hampshire, U.S.

- Location within New Hampshire Location within the United States
- Location: 10 Willow Avenue; North Hampton, New Hampshire U.S.
- Coordinates: 42.9616°N 70.774°W
- Status: Open seasonally
- Website: fullergardens.org

Fuller Gardens is a seaside public botanical garden located at 10 Willow Avenue in the town of North Hampton, New Hampshire, United States, in a historic area known as "Little Boars Head". Developed in the early 20th century, the gardens are set on three acres (1.2 ha) and feature formal rose gardens, a Japanese garden, English perennial borders, a tropical and desert conservatory, tulip and annual beds, a hosta garden and a dahlia display area. The gardens are open to the public daily from mid-May through mid-October.

The gardens were created as an ornament to the grand summer estate Runnymede-by-the-Sea by businessman and Massachusetts governor Alvan T. Fuller. The original design was by Arthur Shurcliff, who was the architect of record when the estate was built in 1927. Shortly thereafter in 1931, Alvan Fuller contacted Olmstead Brothers to redesign the grounds. The gardens were expanded to include the recent purchase of an adjacent property and was to include formal rose gardens rather than cutting gardens as was included in the Shurtcleff design. The Olmstead design was in the Colonial Revival style and includes many statues and fountains that were collected by Fuller during his travels through Europe.

The summer estate was removed in 1962 due to the wishes of Fuller, so that visitors to the gardens could have an unobstructed view of the Atlantic. The Fuller Gardens are now run as a non-profit organization by the Fuller Foundation of New Hampshire. Daily admissions and a large member base help support nearly half of its operating costs. There are many social and horticultural events throughout the season.
