= North Hampton, New Hampshire =

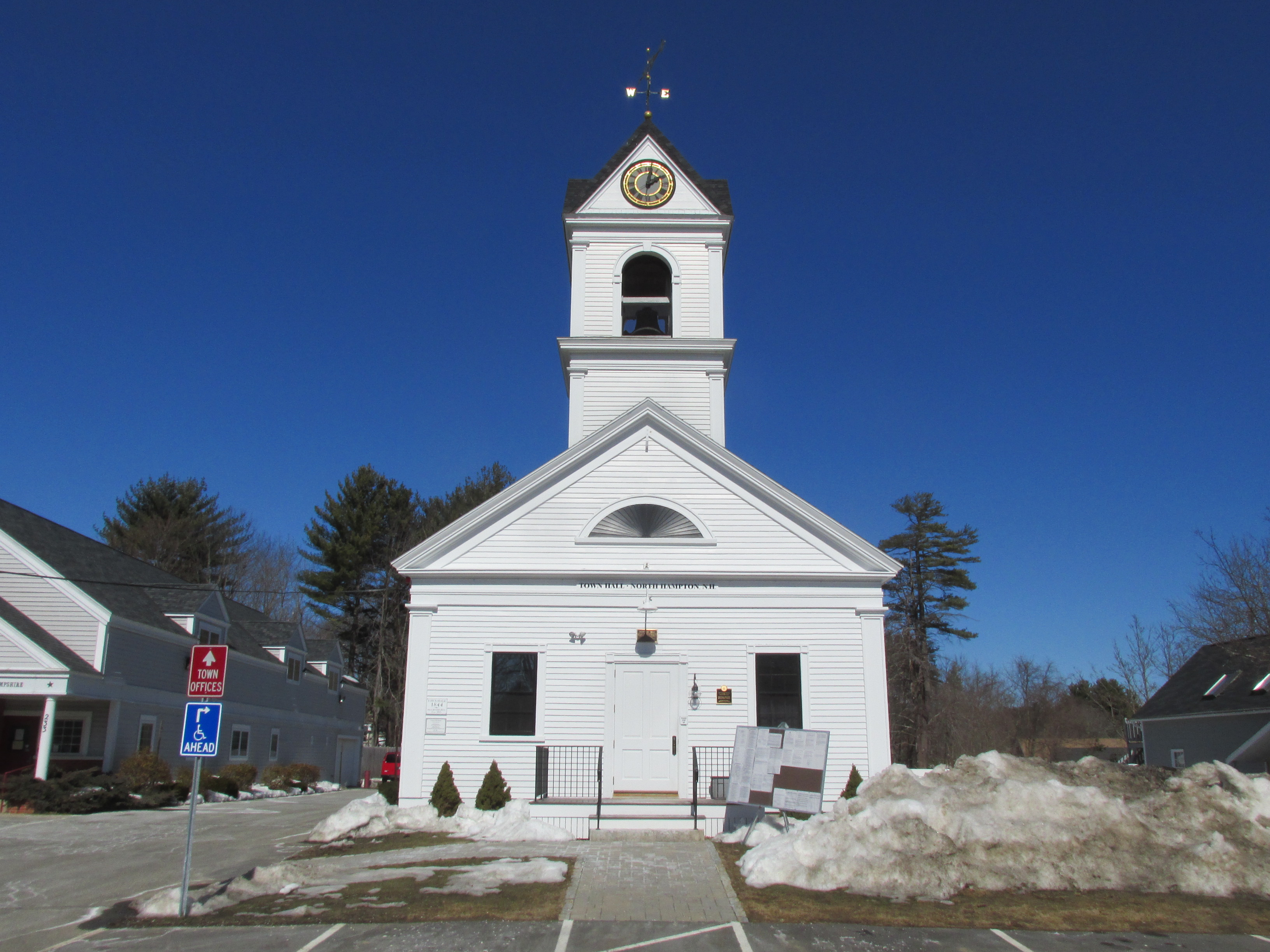
- 1844 Town Hall, listed on the National Register of Historic Places

- Flag Seal

- Location in Rockingham County and the state of New Hampshire.
- Coordinates: 42°58′35″N 70°50′52″W
- Country: United States
- State: New Hampshire
- County: Rockingham
- Incorporated: November 30, 1742
- Villages: North Hampton; North Hampton Center; Cemetery Corners; Fogg Corner; Little Boars Head

Area
  - Total: 14.4 sq mi (37.3 km^{2})
  - Land: 13.9 sq mi (36.0 km^{2})
  - Water: 0.50 sq mi (1.3 km^{2}) 3.46%
- Elevation: 59 ft (18 m)

Population (2020)
  - Total: 4,538
  - Density: 327/sq mi (126.2/km^{2})
- Time zone: UTC-5 (Eastern)
  - Summer (DST): UTC-4 (Eastern)
- ZIP code: 03862
- Area code: 603
- FIPS code: 33-54580
- GNIS feature ID: 873687
- Website: www.northhampton-nh.gov

North Hampton is a town in Rockingham County, New Hampshire, United States. The population was 4,538 at the 2020 census. The town is located along the Atlantic coast.

== History ==
First settled in 1639, the town was a part of Hampton known as "North Hill" or "North Parish". Residents began petitioning for separation from Hampton as early as 1719, but township was not granted until 1742 by colonial governor Benning Wentworth, following separation of New Hampshire from Massachusetts.

Little Boar's Head, a seaside promontory, became a fashionable summer resort area in the 19th century, and contains elegant examples of late Victorian and Edwardian architecture.

== Geography ==
North Hampton is in southeastern New Hampshire, bordered to the east by the Atlantic Ocean. It is bordered to the north by the towns of Greenland and Rye, to the west by Stratham, and to the south by Hampton. It touches the town of Exeter to the west at a single point.

According to the U.S. Census Bureau, North Hampton has a total area of 14.4 square miles (37.3 km^{2}), of which 13.9 square miles (36.0 km^{2}) are land and 0.50 square miles (1.3 km^{2}) are water, comprising 3.46% of the town. The highest point in North Hampton is the summit of Pine Hill, at 160 feet (49 m) above sea level, on the town's western border. The town is drained to the east by the Little River, which flows directly to the Atlantic Ocean, and to the northwest by the Winnicut River, which flows to Great Bay, which in turn reaches the Atlantic by way of the Piscataqua River through Portsmouth.

== Demographics ==
Historical population
Census	Pop.	Note	%±
1790	657		—
1800	653		−0.6%
1810	651		−0.3%
1820	764		17.4%
1830	767		0.4%
1840	885		15.4%
1850	822		−7.1%
1860	771		−6.2%
1870	723		−6.2%
1880	774		7.1%
1890	804		3.9%
1900	812		1.0%
1910	782		−3.7%
1920	677		−13.4%
1930	695		2.7%
1940	818		17.7%
1950	1,104		35.0%
1960	1,910		73.0%
1970	3,259		70.6%
1980	3,425		5.1%
1990	3,637		6.2%
2000	4,259		17.1%
2010	4,301		1.0%
2020	4,538		5.5%
U.S. Decennial Census

As of the census of 2000, there were 4,259 people, 1,671 households, and 1,234 families residing in the town. The population density was 306.3 inhabitants per square mile (118.3/km^{2}). There were 1,782 housing units at an average density of 128.1 per square mile (49.5/km^{2}). The racial makeup of the town was 98.40% White, 0.31% African American, 0.05% Native American, 0.63% Asian, 0.21% from other races, and 0.40% from two or more races. Hispanic or Latino of any race were 0.77% of the population.

There were 1,671 households, out of which 29.8% had children under the age of 18 living with them, 64.6% were married couples living together, 7.0% had a female householder with no husband present, and 26.1% were non-families. 20.0% of all households were made up of individuals, and 8.3% had someone living alone who was 65 years of age or older. The average household size was 2.55 and the average family size was 2.96.

In the town, the population was spread out, with 23.3% under the age of 18, 4.4% from 18 to 24, 27.4% from 25 to 44, 30.5% from 45 to 64, and 14.3% who were 65 years of age or older. The median age was 42 years. For every 100 females, there were 95.3 males. For every 100 females age 18 and over, there were 94.3 males.

The median income for a household in the town was $66,696, and the median income for a family was $72,500. Males had a median income of $51,451 versus $31,512 for females. The per capita income for the town was $34,187. About 1.6% of families and 3.3% of the population were below the poverty line, including 0.7% of those under age 18 and 6.1% of those age 65 or over.

== Arts and culture ==
Sites of interest include:

- Centennial Hall
- Drake Farm
- Fuller Gardens
- Little Boar's Head Historic District
- North Hampton State Beach
- North Hampton Town Hall
- Old North Hampton Library

== Infrastructure ==
Highways include:

- U.S. Route 1
- New Hampshire Route 1A
- New Hampshire Route 151
- New Hampshire Route 111
- Interstate 95

== Notable people ==
- Henry Dearborn (1751–1829), general, US congressman from Massachusetts; 5th US Secretary of War
- Abraham Drake (1715–1781), commanded 2nd N.H. Militia during Saratoga campaign
- Alvan T. Fuller (1878–1958), 50th governor of Massachusetts (summer residence)
- Yvonne Furneaux (1926–2024), actress
- Ogden Nash (1902–1971), poet; buried in North Hampton
- Bonnie Newman (born 1945), politician
- Herbert Philbrick (1915–1993), Boston ad executive; noted Cold War citizen spy for the FBI

=== Thoroughbreds ===
- Mom's Command and Dancer's Image were notable thoroughbreds owned by Peter D. Fuller at Runnymede Farm in North Hampton; the former horse is buried there. Both horses are featured on a billboard along NH Route 111.
