= Centenary (disambiguation) =

Centenary in British English, is a 100th anniversary or otherwise relates to a century, a period of 100 years

Centenary may also refer to:

== Places ==
=== Australia ===
- Centenary Suburbs, a group of suburbs of Brisbane, Queensland, Australia

=== United Kingdom ===
- Centenary (ward), an electoral ward in London

=== United States ===
- Centenary, Indiana, an unincorporated community
- Centenary, South Carolina, an unincorporated community
- Centenary, Virginia, an unincorporated community

=== Zimbabwe ===
- Centenary, Zimbabwe, a village in Mashonaland Central Province, Zimbabwe

== Schools ==
- Centenary College of Louisiana, a private college in Shreveport, Louisiana, United States
- Centenary State High School, a high school in Brisbane, Queensland, Australia
- Centenary University, a private university in Hackettstown, New Jersey, United States

== Other ==
- Centenary (concert), a television event produced to mark the 100-year anniversary of Ireland's 1916 Easter Rising

== See also ==
- Centenarian, a person who has reached the age of 100 years
- Centenario (disambiguation)
- Centennial (disambiguation)
- Century (disambiguation)
