= Centennial High School =

Centennial High School may refer to:

== United States ==
- Centennial High School (Arizona), Peoria, Arizona (Phoenix area)
- Centennial High School (Compton, California), Compton, California (Los Angeles area)
- Centennial High School (Corona, California), Corona, California (Inland Empire)
- Centennial High School (Bakersfield, California), Bakersfield, California
- Centennial High School (Pueblo, Colorado), Pueblo, Colorado
- Centennial High School (Georgia), Roswell, Georgia (Atlanta area)
- Centennial High School (Idaho), Boise, Idaho
- Centennial High School (Maryland), Ellicott City, Maryland (Baltimore area)
- Centennial High School (Minnesota), Blaine, Minnesota (Minneapolis-Saint Paul)
- Centennial High School (Las Vegas), Las Vegas, Nevada
- Centennial High School (New Mexico), Las Cruces, New Mexico
- Centennial High School (Ohio), Columbus, Ohio
- Centennial High School (Oregon), Gresham, Oregon
- Centennial High School (Tennessee), Franklin, Tennessee
- Centennial High School (Burleson, Texas), Burleson, Texas (Dallas-Fort Worth)
- Centennial High School (Frisco, Texas), Frisco, Texas (Dallas-Fort Worth)
- Ankeny Centennial High School, Ankeny, Iowa (Des Moines area)
- Champaign Centennial High School, Champaign, Illinois
- Lakeview Centennial High School, Garland, Texas (Dallas-Fort Worth)
- St. Lucie West Centennial High School, Port St. Lucie, Florida

== Canada ==
- Centennial High School (Calgary), a senior high in Calgary, Alberta
- Centennial Regional High School, a multi-campus English language high school in Quebec
- Centennial Secondary School (Windsor, Ontario), also called Centennial High School, a former senior high school in Windsor, Ontario

== See also ==
- Centennial Secondary School (disambiguation)
- Centennial Collegiate, Saskatoon, Saskatchewan, Canada, a high school
