= Joel Kline =

American real estate speculator (born 1939)

- Employer: Montgomery Land Investment
- Known for: Land speculation

Joel Kline (born 1939) is an American real estate speculator who testified against several prominent Maryland politicians, and subsequently entered one of Maryland's longest bankruptcy proceedings.

Kline employed a method of using public stock offerings to finance speculative land development deals. The stock purchases and land purchases were also funded by a series of loans secured by close-tied investors which included Maryland Roads Commissioner Walter Bucher, Agnew aide J. Walter Jones, Lester Matz, United States Senator Mike Gravel, Gerald Freeman, and insuranceman Maury Young.

In 1969, Maryland Governor Marvin Mandel appointed Kline to The Maryland Industrial Development Financing Authority, an agency to distribute loans for public-private development projects. In 1971, Governor Mandel proposed Kline to a board investigating state banks, then filled the position of Maryland Banking Commissioner. In November, Lt. Governor Blair Lee III had to repay $25,00 in loans and $9,000 in expenses from using the personal office of Kline during his 1970 campaign. The publication of the questionable ties to loans caused Kline to lose his position as banking commissioner. Kline had also contributed maximum amounts to Lee through his interests in Prince Georges Land Investment and Development Inc, Penn Metal Fabricators, and Montgomery Land Investment and Development Inc. Lee acquired the finances to repay the loans through Kline-owned firms, and Leonard Blondes, who was indicted for bribery and conspiracy.

According to an SEC investigation in 1972, Kline was taking out large poorly secured loans from the American National Bank of Maryland and Madison National Bank to pay off other loan debts.

Kline claimed to have redirected money to Spiro Agnew when he was the Governor of Maryland, and to Baltimore County Executive Dale Anderson, in exchange for political favors. Maryland Attorney General Stephen Sachs gave Kline immunity from criminal prosecution in exchange for information that assisted the investigation of Spiro Agnew, who would resign in 1973. Kline served four months of a six-month sentence in a prison in Allenwood, Pennsylvania, for conspiracy to obstruct justice, and was frequently held with Watergate witnesses at Fort Holabird for interrogations to provide testimony.

In 1974, Joel Kline, Eric Adolph Baer and Donald Harrison Abrams were indicted in connection with their efforts to obstruct the SEC investigation into price manipulation of over-the-counter stocks of Penn Metal Fabrications, Inc., U.S. Vinyl Corp. and Montgomery Land Investment and Development Corporation. The commission noted attempts to convince false testimony and destruction of evidence. Kline was sentenced to 20 months in jail and a $10,000 fine.

Kline operated land holding partnerships across Maryland. Some included the Prince Georges Land Development and Investment Company, Rte. 108 Property Partnership in Howard County, and the Victory Farm in Gaithersburg. Lawyers and trustees Eugene M Feinnblatt and Lawrence D. Coppel spent 19 years pursuing assets of Kline in bankruptcy court after the judge declared there were no assets to return to creditors. In June 1992, Kline was indicted for tax fraud in Fort Lauderdale, Florida.

In 1977, Kline and three other World Trade Center architects, Irving Gershon, Howard Lazar, and Sy J. Miller, testified again under immunity for funneling money in an early 1970s tax evasion scheme involving New York Architect Leo Kornblath and Xaviera Hollander.
