= Centennial Tower =

Centennial Tower may refer to:

- Centennial Tower (Atlanta)
- Centennial Tower (Philadelphia), a planned but unbuilt 1000-feet-tall tower for the Centennial Exposition 1876
- City Center Building, briefly known as the Centennial Tower, Hayward, California
- Centennial Tower (Philippines)
- Centennial Tower (Singapore)
- Centennial Tower (Midland), a highrise building in Midland, Texas
- Centennial Memorial Tower in Nopporo Shinrin Kōen Prefectural Natural Park, Hokkaidō, Japan
