= Memorial Park, Tauranga =

Park in New Zealand

Memorial Park
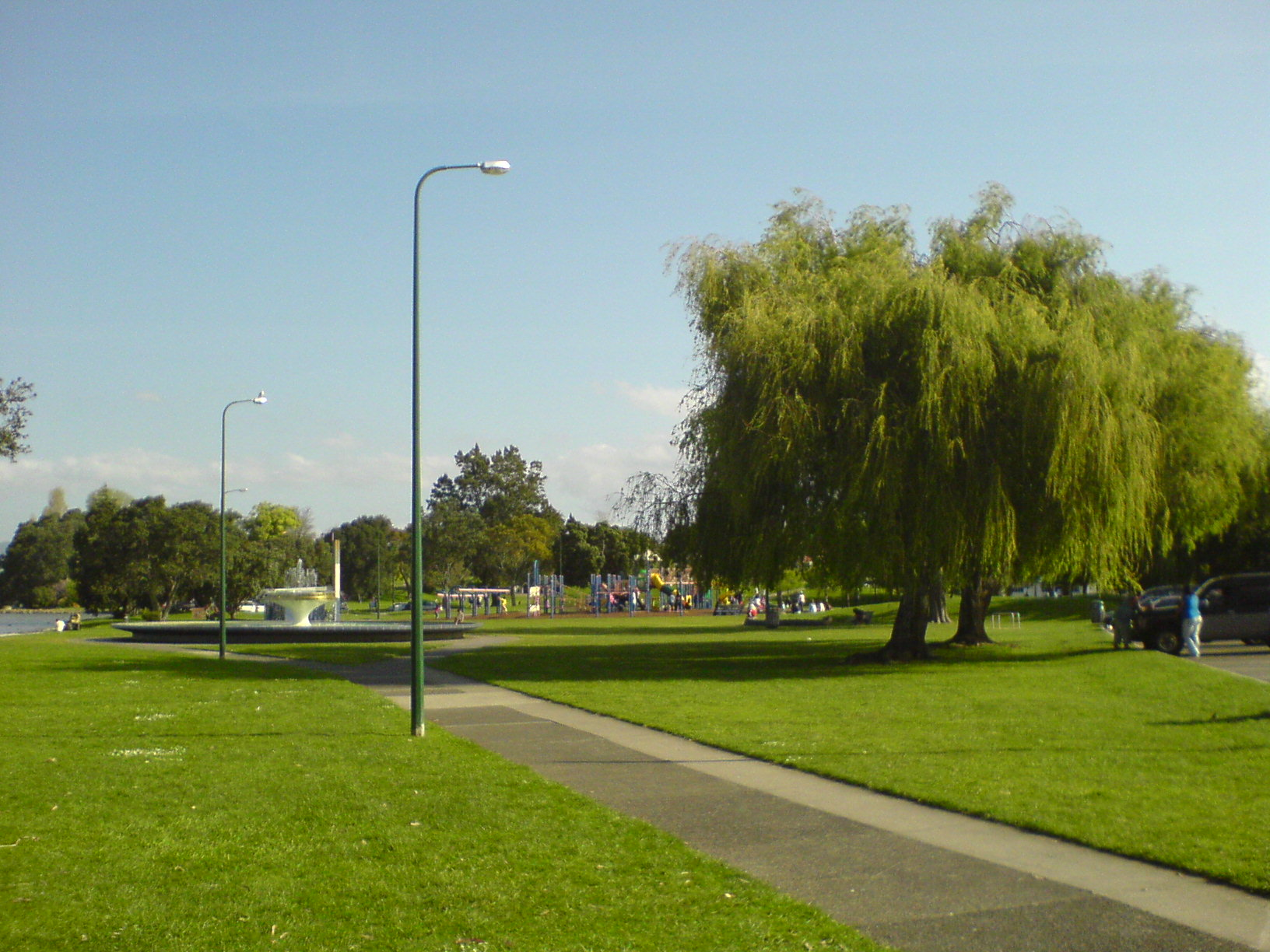
- Facing the south side of Memorial Park with the fountain visible, 2007
- Interactive map of Memorial Park
- Location: Tauranga, New Zealand
- Coordinates: 37°41′51″S 176°9′54″E
- Area: 11 ha (27 acres)

Memorial Park is a park located in Tauranga, New Zealand. Originally named Centennial Park after the centenary of the signing of the Treaty of Waitangi, it was renamed Memorial Park after the Second World War to qualify for a government war memorial subsidy. The park features cenotaphs inscribed with the names of the local men who died in the First and Second World Wars. The park also contains pools, the Queen Elizabeth II Youth Centre, playgrounds, a rideable miniature railway, miniature golf, an illuminated fountain and a Humpty Dumpty sculpture.

== History ==
Throughout 1936 and 1940 the Tauranga Borough Council made several land acquisitions, totalling 11 hectares (27 acres), with the intention of creating a space for recreation. Originally named the Centennial Park, after the centenary of the signing of the Treaty of Waitangi, it was renamed to Memorial Park following the Second World War to qualify for a government war memorial subsidy.

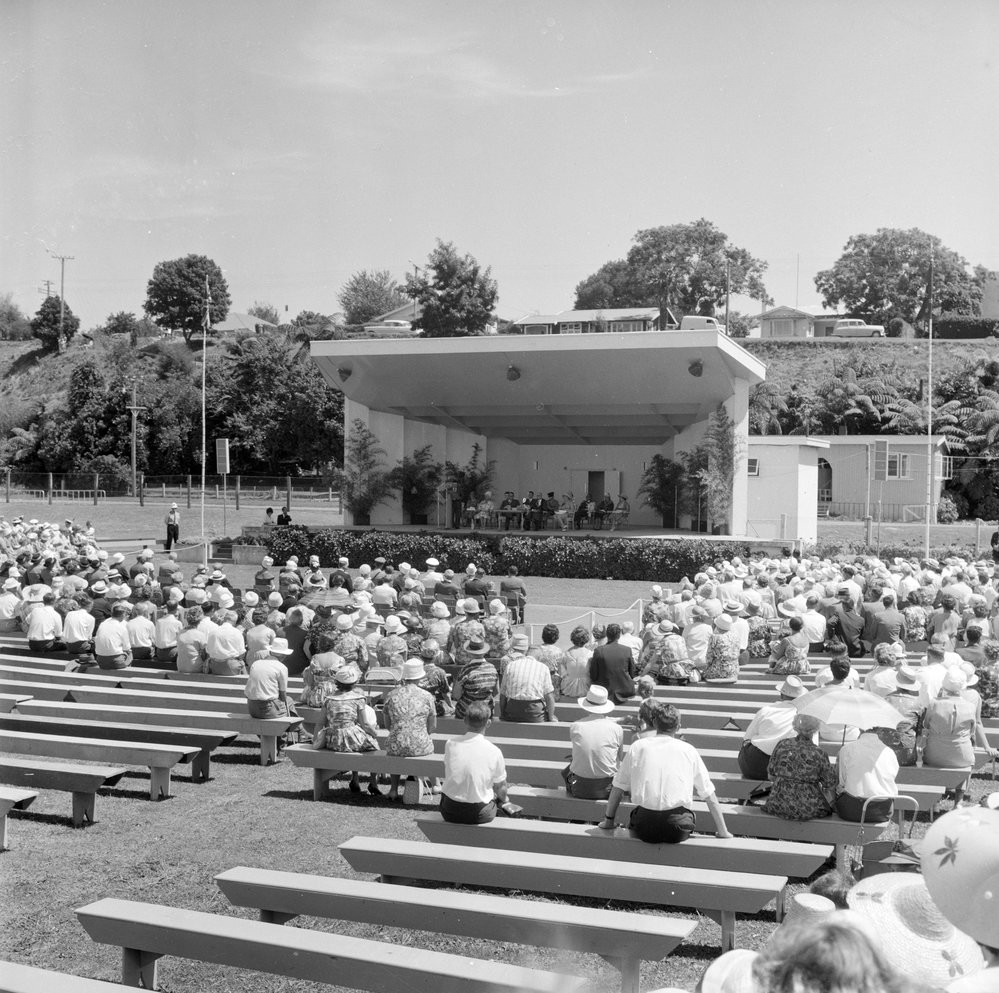
The Governor-General at the sound shell in 1962

Sports grounds were developed by 1952. The first building in the park was a sound shell, which opened late 1954, after mayor Bill Barnard called for an entertainment venue in Tauranga. It was demolished in 1985 so that the park could be further developed. The park's memorial swimming pool was opened in 1955, the memorial hall in 1957 and the fountain in 1962. In 1963 Queen Elizabeth II and her husband, Prince Philip, Duke of Edinburgh, visited the park which attracted a crowd of 5,000 people. The Queen Elizabeth II Youth Centre was opened in 1967.

Plans for a new memorial began in 1989 for the park's south-eastern corner. Originally planned to commemorate the 75th anniversary of the Gallipoli landings and the country's sesquicentenary, it was instead opened on Armistice Day 1990 instead of Anzac Day (Anzac day occurs on the anniversary of the Gallipoli landings).

A $28 million waterfront walkway from Memorial Park to The Strand, a street in Tauranga, was planned since 2004, but was cancelled in 2025.

In 2021, plans started on building a new aquatic centre at the park at a cost above $100 million. Until November 2024, $4.7 million was spent on the plans. The plan was to have the youth centre demolished. The youth centre has seismic issues as of 2023 and the repair cost has been estimated to be up to $128 million. The plans for the aquatic centre were paused in 2024 and in 2025 it was announced that the design would be scrapped and replaced with a new one. With the new plans, the youth centre will not be demolished and the aquatic centre would instead be built on the site of the current Memorial Park pools.

== Memorials ==
At the north entrance of the park there is a cenotaph made from dressed stones. On it is a granite tablet with the text "They gave their lives; lest we forget 1939–1945" with a list of 63 local men who died in the Second World War. It is not known when the cenotaph was unveiled.

The memorial at the south-eastern corner of the park, opened in 1990, has several steps which lead to a cenotaph. The cenotaph has several black granite tablets with the names of 86 local men who died in the First World War and 72 from the Second World War, as well as other wars that New Zealand has served in such as in South Africa and Vietnam. The list of names combines the names on the other cenotaph in the park, as well as the Tauranga First World War memorial gates and the Tauranga RSA.

In 1993 memorial trees were planted in the south-eastern corner of the park for the 75th anniversary of Armistice Day. More memorial trees were planted in 1995 for the 50th anniversary of VE and VJ Days.

== Attractions ==
Memorial Park has two playgrounds as well as barbeques, a skate ramp, miniature golf, a rideable miniature railway, the Queen Elizabeth Youth Centre, pools, a fountain and a Humpty Dumpty statue.

=== Fountain ===
The park has an illuminated fountain which was opened in 1962 after it was built by the community with 5,000 volunteer hours. A child almost drowned in it in 2002 which prompted the council to place signs banning members of the public from swimming in the pool. The council also proposed fencing the fountain off and spending $20,000 on safety upgrades which would reduce the water depth, but the council decided not to go ahead with them. In 2023 a four-year-old girl drowned in the fountain. Afterwards it was drained and cordoned off and the Tauranga City Council investigated the safety of all its water features in its parks and reserves. In early 2024 the council spent $100,000 on a safety upgrade to reduce the water depth while still allowing for the flow of water.

=== Humpty Dumpty statue ===
The original statue of the nursery rhyme character Humpty Dumpty, made of concrete by Peter McTainsh, was placed in the park in December 1959, when the playground opened. It was originally on a high wall, but was destroyed by vandals after a few years and a new one was placed on a lower wall. After it was vandalised in December 2021, causing an arm to come off and chips of its head to be removed, it was refurbished at a cost of $13,000, which was completed in early 2022. The refurbishment gave the statue a new appearance, including a pounamu, sneakers, jeans, a painting of it surfing in Mount Maunganui on its back and a kiwi in a pocket.
