= Centennial Discovery =

- Developer(s): Centennial Software Limited
- Final release: Centennial Discovery 2005 SP1 / 2005
- Type: IT asset management
- Website: www.centennial-software.com

Centennial Discovery Software is an IT Asset Management (ITAM) tool which identifies and records software and hardware inventories on networked devices with the centennial reporting service installed.

Each device is set up with a scheduled reporting cycle i.e. on a small desktop estate one might have each device report in every day or even every hour. However on a large corporate estate a 10-day cycle is more appropriate to reduce network traffic as well as the volume of historical data Centennial stores.

Centennial comes with a 'Control Center' application with which this data can be viewed and queried although all the data is stored in an SQL database which can be queried externally to produce usage reports etc.

On April 28, 2008, FrontRange Solutions acquired Centennial Software for an undisclosed sum.
