= Centennial Lake (Maryland) =

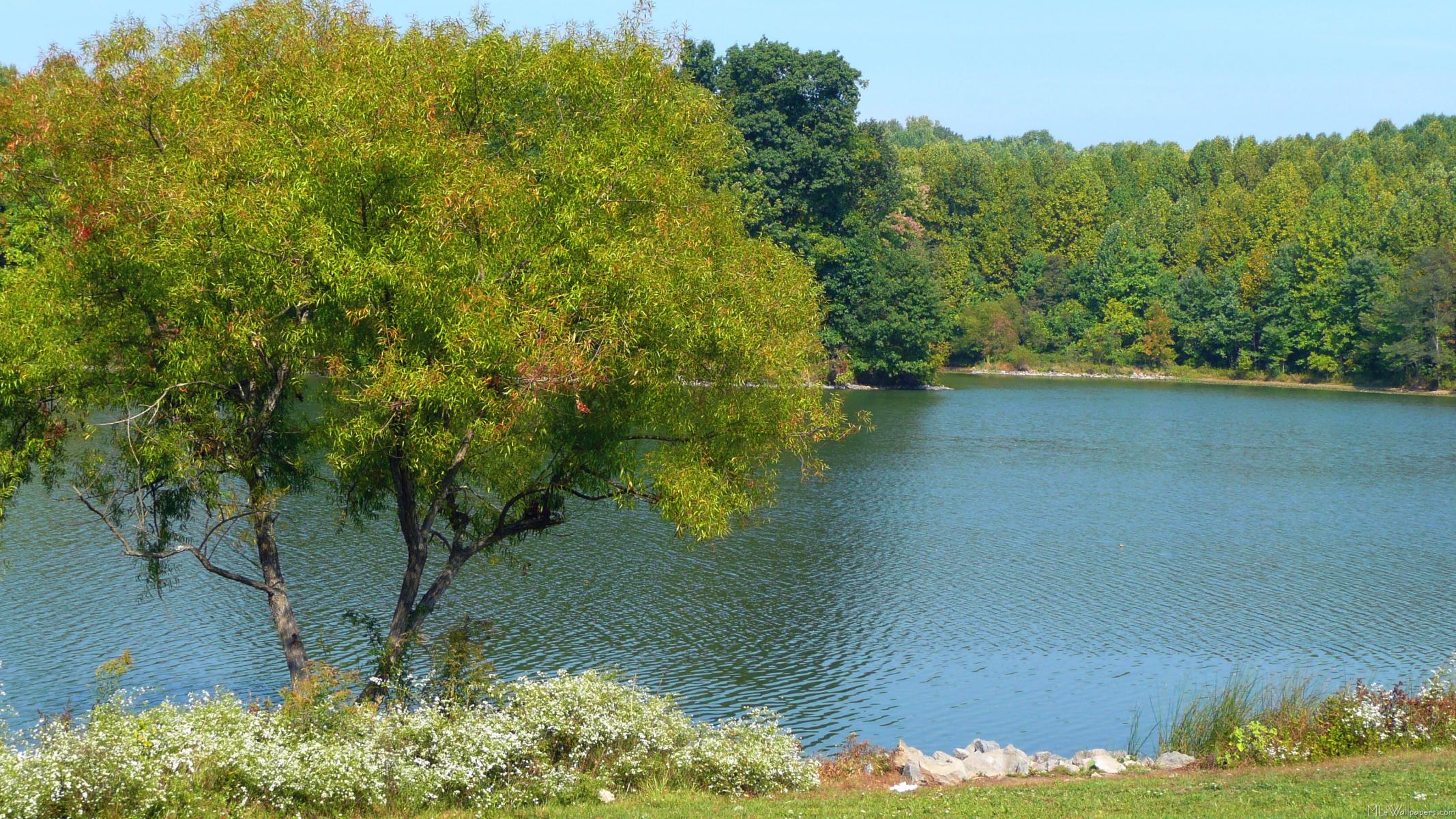
- Looking out over Centennial Lake from the walking path surrounding it

- Location within Maryland Location within the United States
- Location: Ellicott City, Maryland, United States
- Coordinates: 39°14.6′N 76°51.3′W
- Type: Reservoir
- Primary outflows: Centennial Branch, Little Patuxent River
- Basin countries: United States
- Surface area: 54 acres (22 ha)
- Surface elevation: 344 ft (105 m)

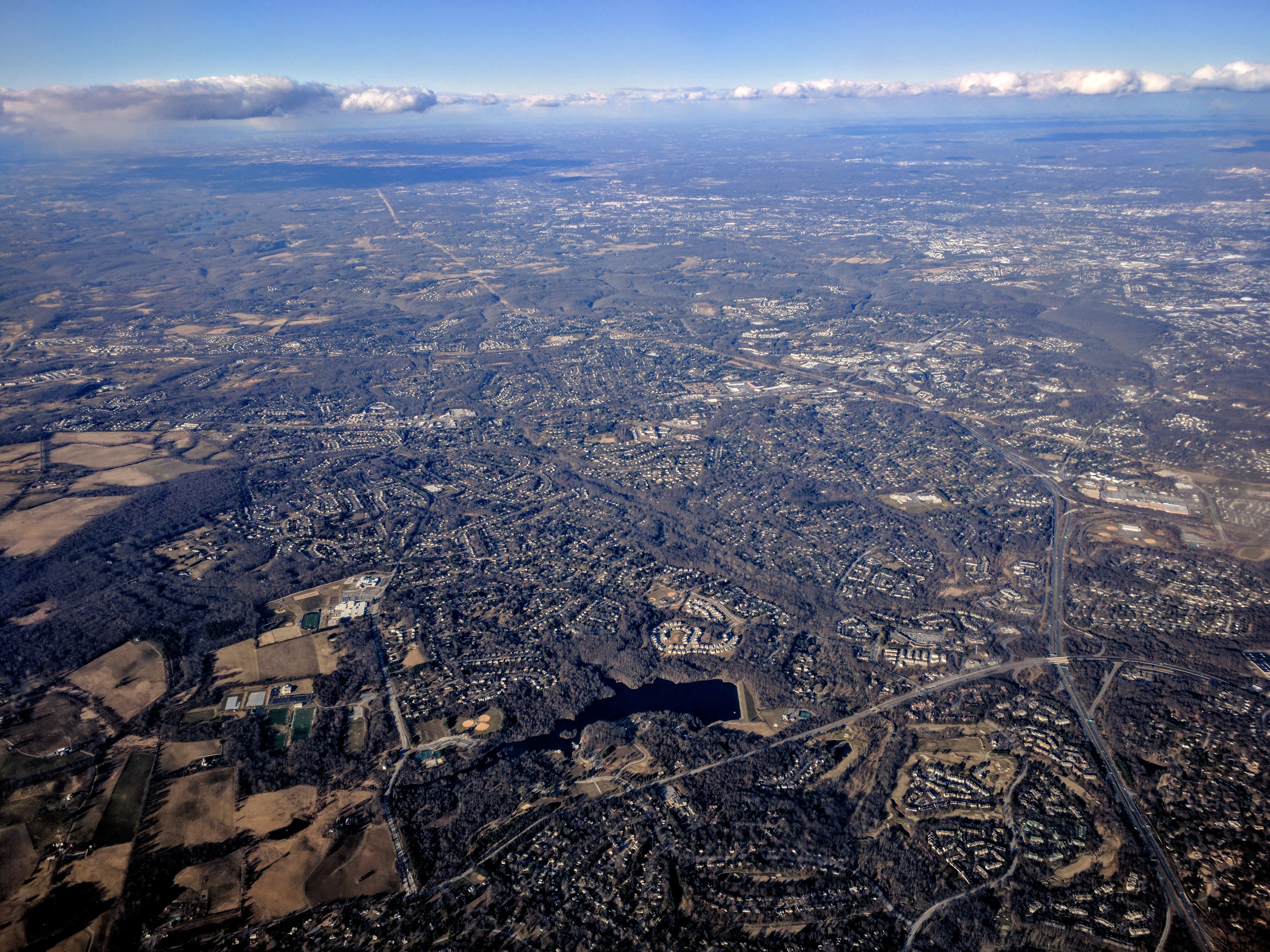
Aerial view of the lake from the south, with surrounding suburb of Ellicott City, Maryland

Centennial Lake is a man-made 54-acre (220,000 m^{2}) reservoir, in a 325-acre (1.32 km^{2}) park in Howard County, Maryland, near Columbia, Maryland and Clarksville, known as Centennial Park. It was created by damming the Centennial Branch of the Little Patuxent River. The lake and the park feature a dam, a wildlife area, a walking trail, boating, fishing, and other recreational activities. The park is owned by the Howard County Department of Recreation and Parks.

The lake is used by the county and state for the conservation of various types of fish, such as trout and bass, with fishing restrictions implemented, though an overabundance has resulted in restrictions being lifted at times.

== History ==
In 1969, the County attempted to purchase by condemnation, 64 acres of the land occupying Centennial Park from a company run by the land speculator Joel Kline for $3,180 an acre. The property contained an early 1800s farmhouse that had been destroyed by fire during Kline's ownership. Kline was later indicted for real estate fraud that was linked to local politicians up to Spiro Agnew who was forced to resign. The County eventually bought the Centennial lake parkland from Kline's creditors in 1975 at nearly twice the cost. In 1969, Spiro Agnew proclaimed the arrival of the first Columbia based scientific firm, Hittman Associates that relocated for favorable lease rates from Howard Research and Development. Hittman in turn was contracted by the EPA using Wilde Lake as an example to recommend reuse of storm water runoff from Columbia's reservoir systems for residential drinking water to save on development costs. On 1 December 2013, the lake was temporarily closed following the drowning of a man. In late fall 2015, the lake was lowered nearly 10 feet to accommodate repairs to the dam riser gates. It was restored to normal levels in January 2016.

== See also ==
- Lake Elkhorn
- Lake Kittamaqundi
