= Centennial Fountain (Oklahoma City) =

Fountain in Oklahoma City, Oklahoma, U.S.

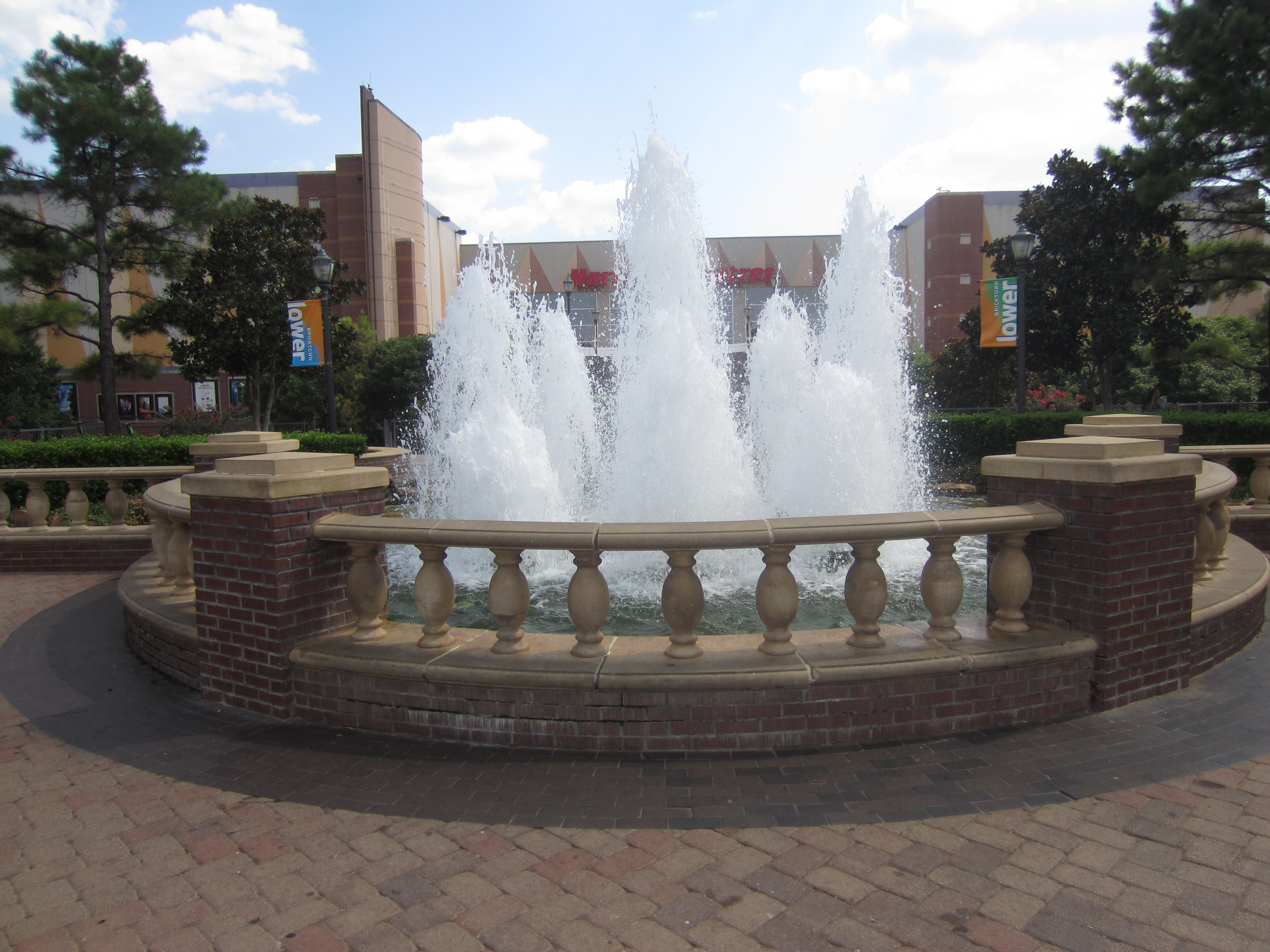
- The fountain in 2019
- Completed: 2004
- Location: Oklahoma City, Oklahoma, U.S.
- Location within Oklahoma
- Coordinates: 35.46381°N 97.50922°W

Centennial Fountain (also known as the Centennial Plaza Fountain) was an outdoor fountain in Bricktown, Oklahoma City, in the U.S. state of Oklahoma. The $300,000 fountain, located along the Bricktown Canal at the intersection of Reno Avenue and Mickey Mantle Drive, was completed in 2004. The Oklahoma Centennial Commission and private donors funded the project. The fountain underwent repairs in 2005. The fountain was removed in 2026 and replaced with a steel sculpture.

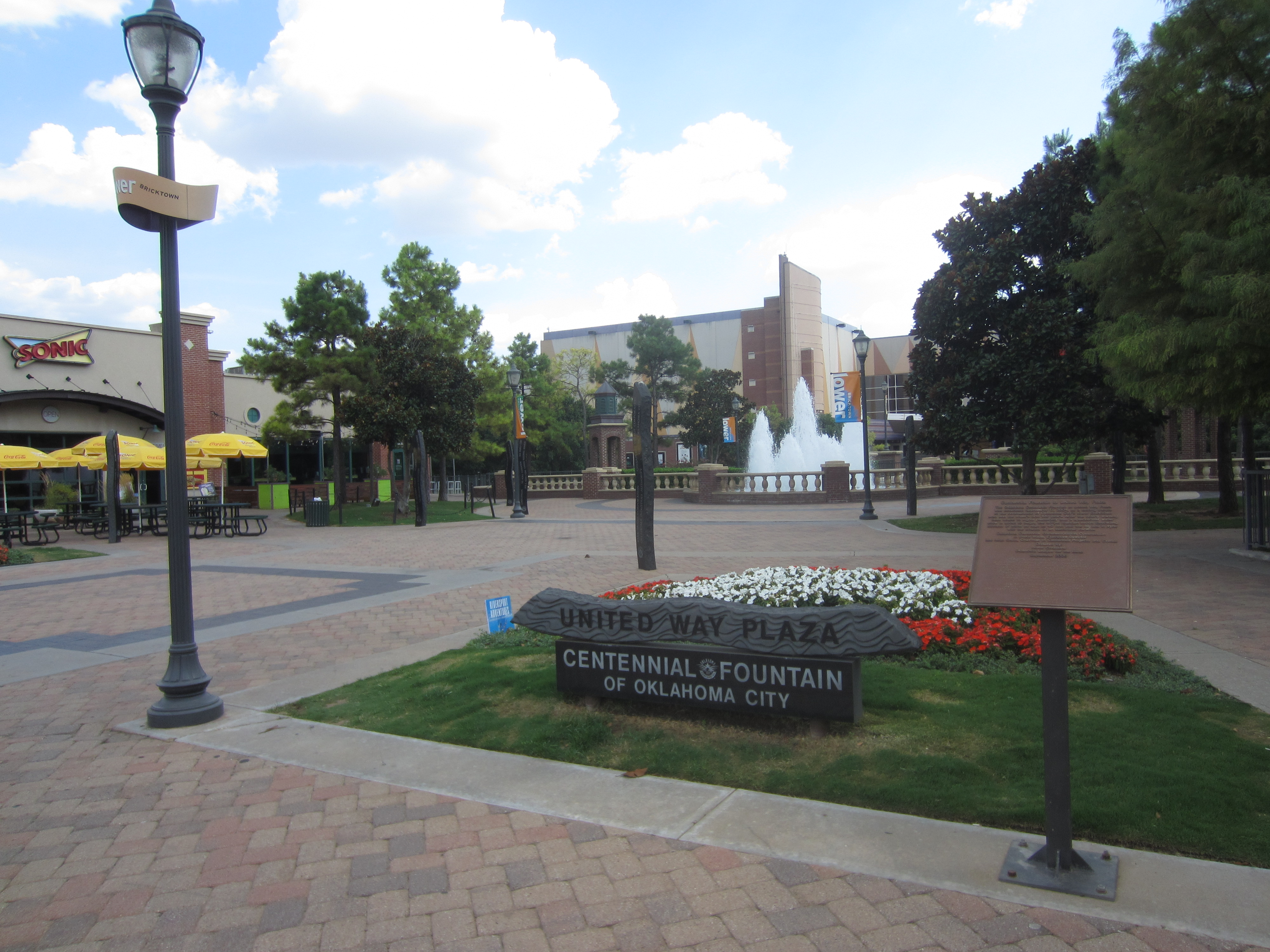
The fountain and plaza in 2019

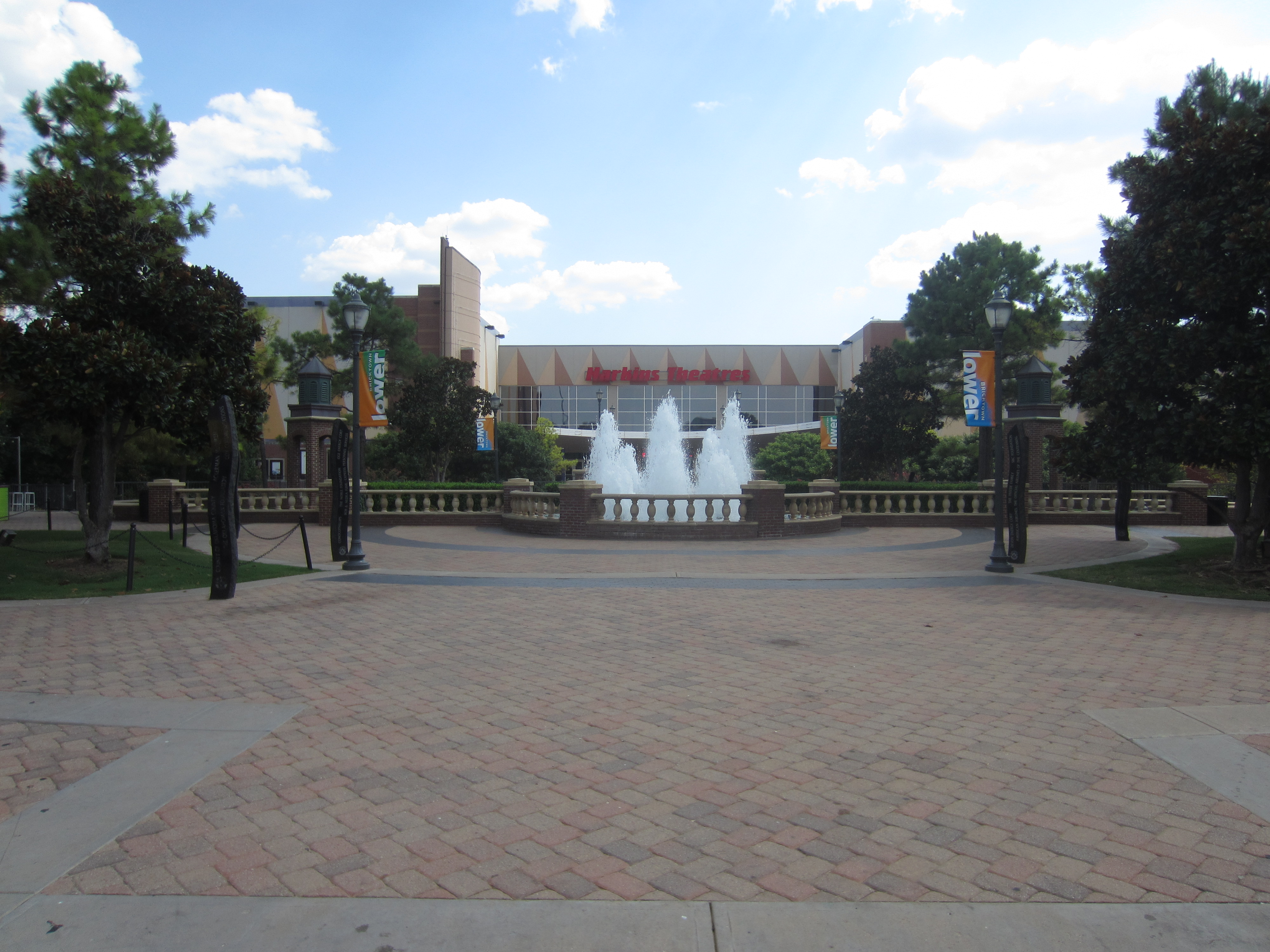
The fountain and plaza in 2019

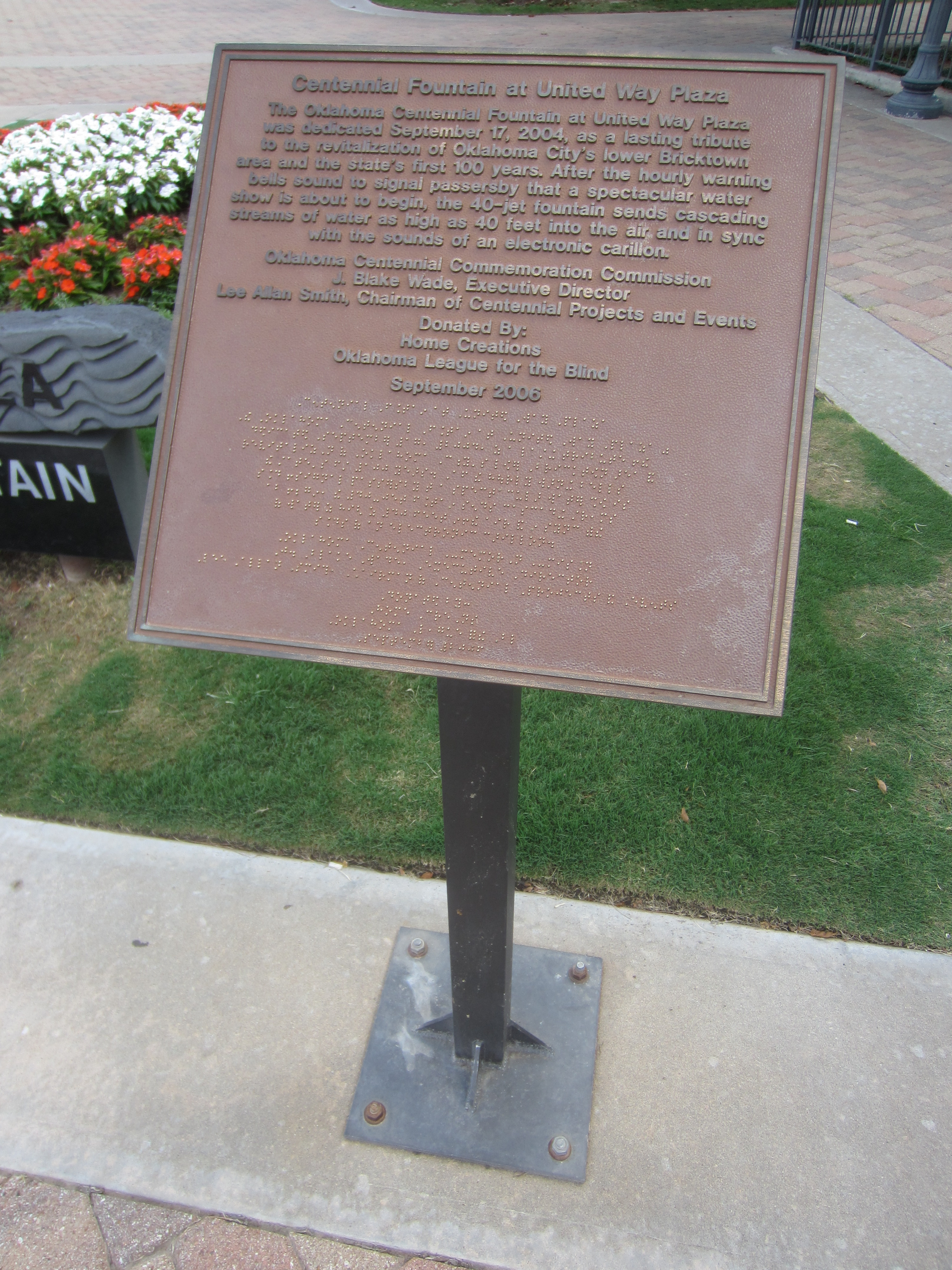
Plaque, 2019
