= Victoria Centennial Fountain =

Fountain in Victoria, British Columbia

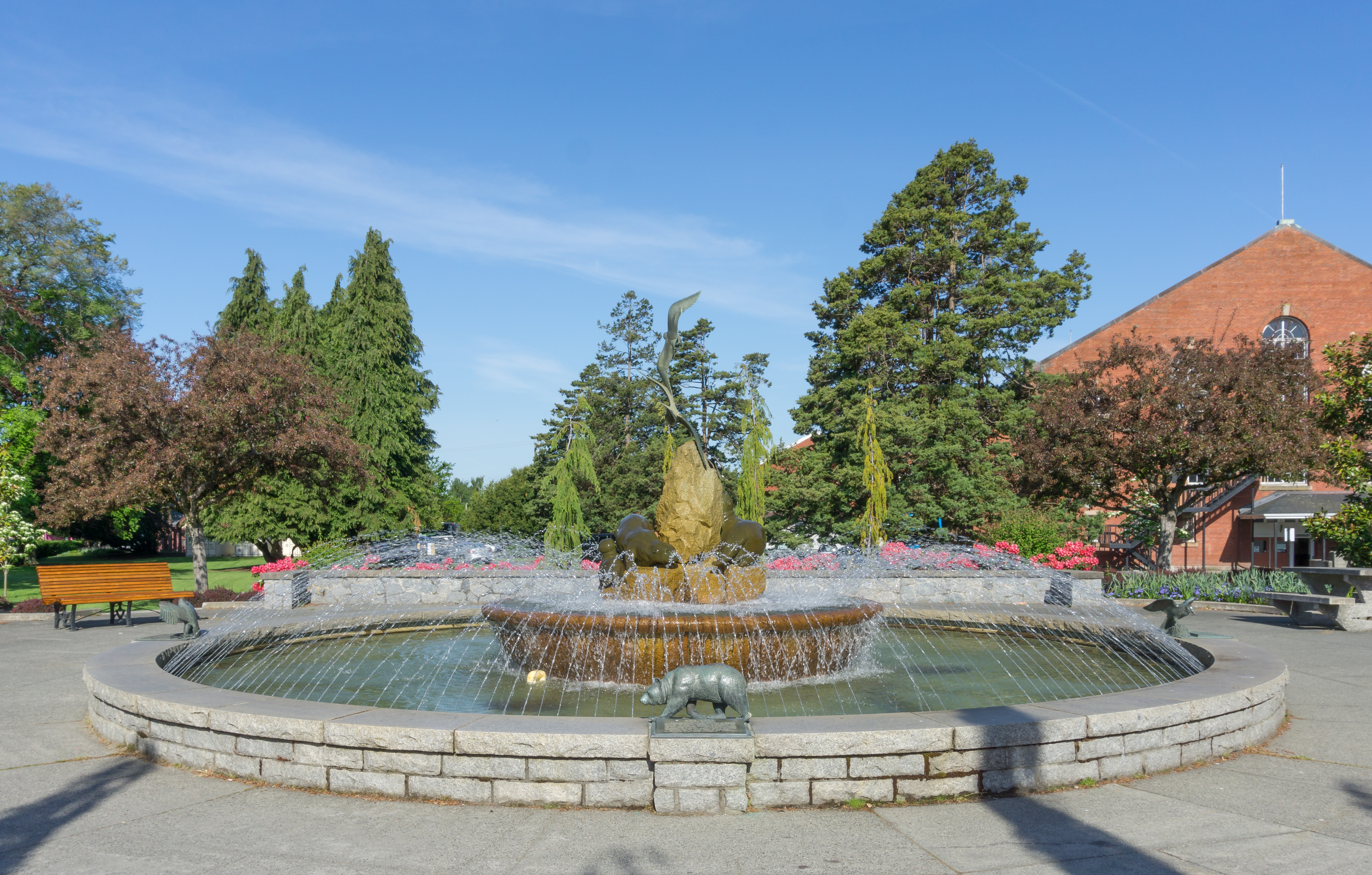
- Artist: Robert Savery
- Year: 1962
- Medium: Bronze sculpture
- Location: Victoria, British Columbia, Canada
- 48.41846°N 123.37061°W

Victoria Centennial Fountain, also known as Back Fountain or simply Centennial Fountain, is installed outside the British Columbia Parliament Buildings in Victoria, British Columbia.

== Description and history ==
The fountain was designed by Robert Savery in 1962, and commemorates the four colonies and territories that formed British Columbia. The bronze sculptures of a bear, eagle, gull, sea otter, raven, and wolf represent the province's geography and history.
