= Centenário, Rio Grande do Sul =

Municipality of Rio Grande do Sul, Brazil

Coordinates: 27°45′39″S 51°59′56″W

- Municipality
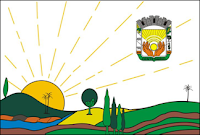
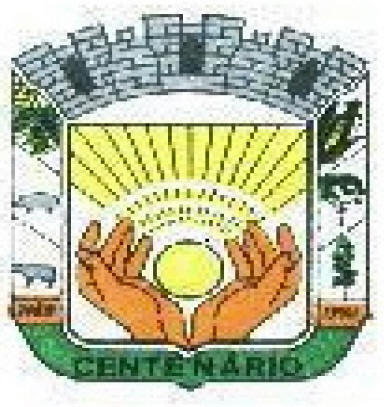
- Flag Coat of arms
- Interactive map of Centenário, Rio Grande do Sul
- Country: Brazil
- Time zone: UTC−3 (BRT)

Centenário is a municipality in the state of Rio Grande do Sul, Brazil. As of 2022, the estimated population was 2,779. Centenário became a municipality on the 20th of March 1992. Its current mayor is Genoir Marcos Florek. Centenário's culture has been influenced over time by the high amounts of Polish immigrants who have moved to the region. One such example is the creation of the International Pierogi Festival, held annually.

== See also ==
- List of municipalities in Rio Grande do Sul
