= Centennial Park (Ellicott City) =

Park in Ellicott City, Maryland, United States

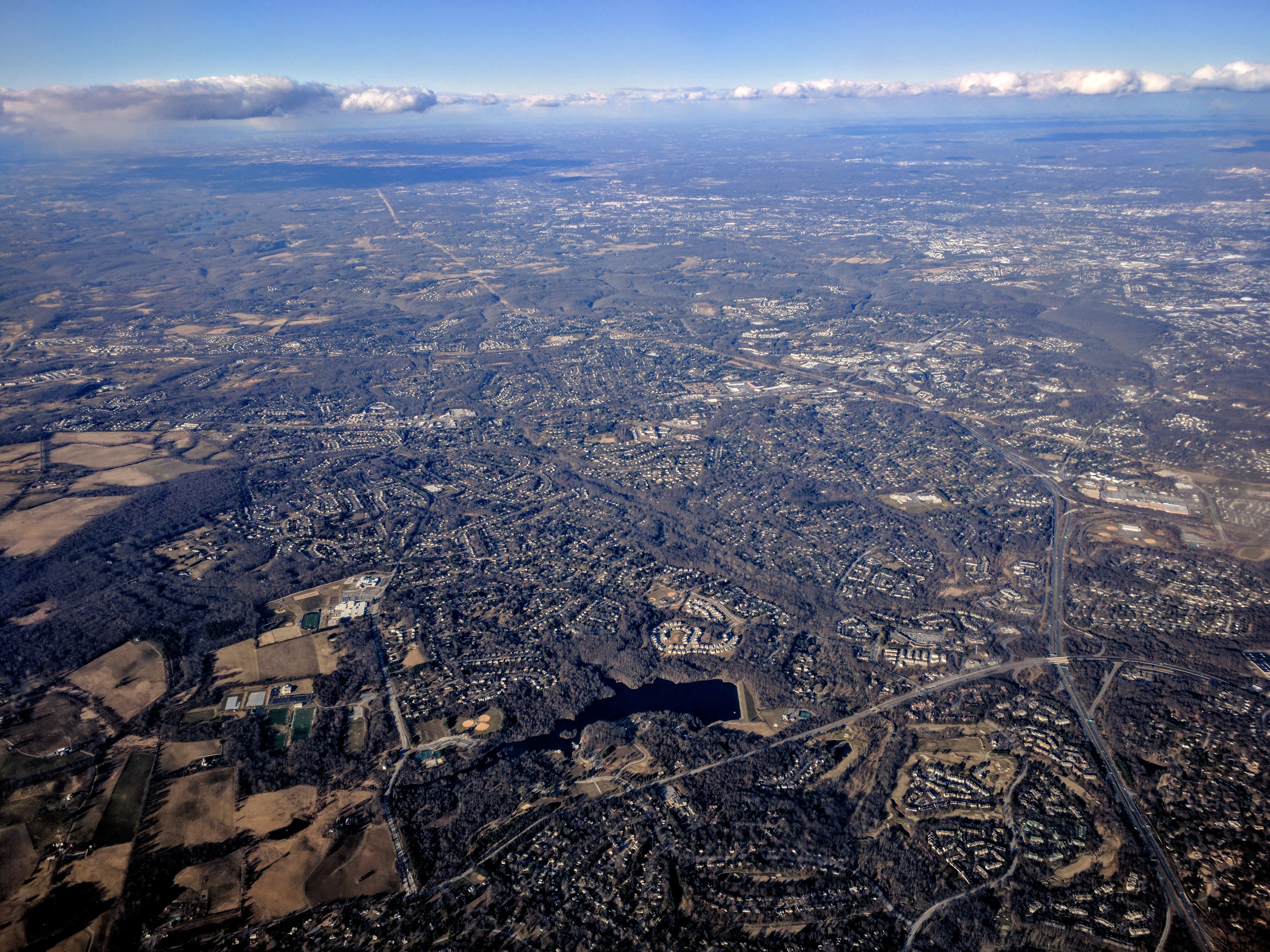
- Aerial view of Centennial Lake in Centennial Park, with Baltimore suburb Ellicott City behind
- Interactive map of Centennial Park
- Type: Recreational Park
- Location: Ellicott City, Maryland, United States
- Coordinates: 39.2436°N 76.8584°W
- Area: 337 acres (136 ha)
- Website: www.howardcountymd.gov/CentennialPark

Centennial Park is a Howard County Department of Recreation & Parks' public park located in Ellicott City, Maryland. It surrounds Centennial Lake, covering an area of 337 acres. There are four areas of Centennial Park, the North, South, East, and West, each with its own entrance.

The path around the lake is a 2.6 mile paved trail loop. Boat rentals are available during certain months of the year, and a boat ramp is available to the public. Fishing is permitted in the lake, but hunting, firearms, swimming, sailboarding, wind surfing, stand up paddleboarding, and inner tubing are all prohibited. Pets are permitted in the park except for in picnic pavilions, playgrounds, and sports areas.

The lake, field, wooded areas and wetlands that make up Centennial Park are home to abundant wildlife. A buoy line restricts access to a portion of the lake reserved as a Wildlife Area, providing a safe spawning area for fish and nesting sites for birds.

The loop around the lake is suitable for running, walking, and biking. There are several benches along the loop and pavilions located nearby. There are also water fountains for public convenience, including water fountains for dogs.
