= Lehi Ward Tithing Barn-Centennial Hall =

- U.S. National Register of Historic Places
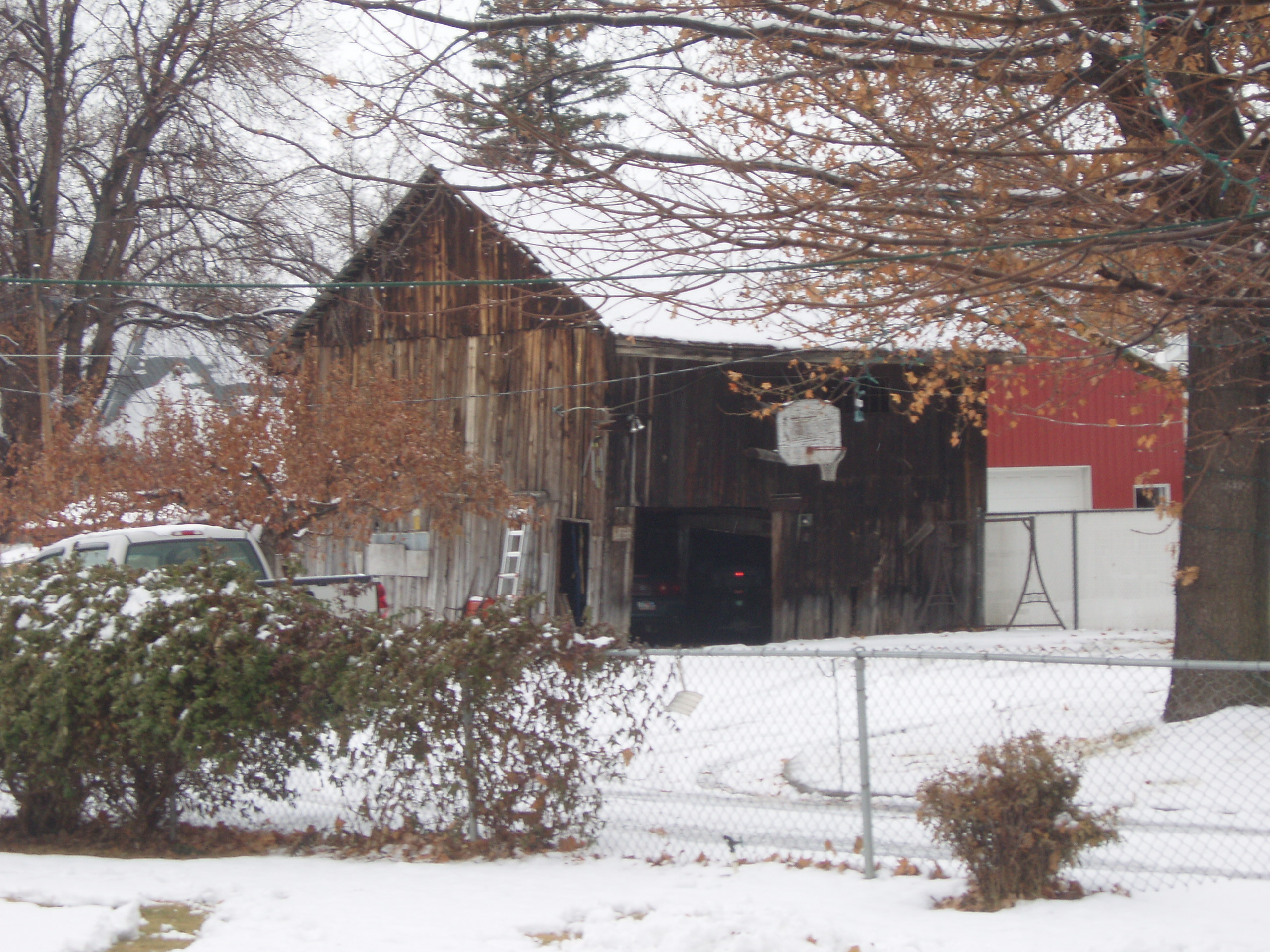

- Location within Utah Location within the United States
- Location: 651 North 200 East, (rear), Lehi, Utah
- Coordinates: 40°23′45″N 111°50′42″W
- Area: 1.3 acres (0.53 ha)
- Built: 1872
- MPS: Lehi, Utah MPS
- NRHP reference No.: 98001456
- Added to NRHP: December 4, 1998

The Lehi Ward Tithing Barn-Centennial Hall, located behind 651 North 200 East in Lehi, Utah, was built in 1872. It was listed on the National Register of Historic Places in 1998.

It was moved to its present location in 1880.

Tithe barns in Europe are some of the largest and oldest timber frame buildings. They are found in many European countries. In America, The Church of Jesus Christ of Latter-day Saints is the only known religious group which built tithing barns.

== See also ==
- Bishops storehouse
