= Centennial Park, Christchurch =

Public park in Spreydon, Christchurch, New Zealand

Coordinates: 43.5677°S 172.6138°E

Centennial Park
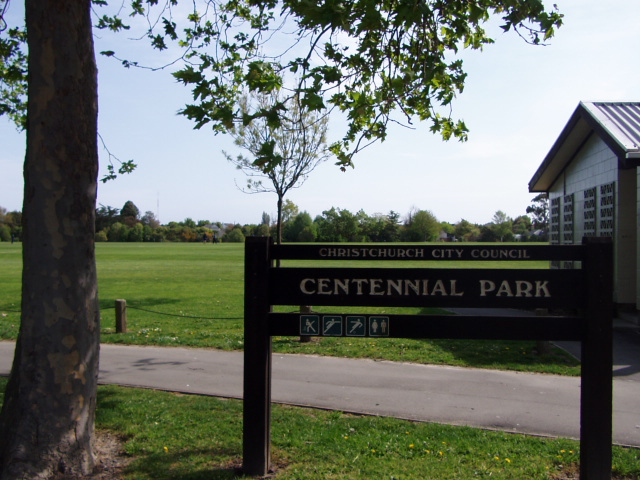
- Entrance to Centennial Park
- Interactive map of Centennial Park
- Type: Sports park
- Location: Christchurch
- Area: 7 hectares (17 acres)
- Operator: Christchurch City Council
- Status: Open all year

Centennial Park is a public park located in the suburb of Spreydon in the southwestern part of Christchurch, New Zealand.

It is bordered by Lyttelton Street to the east, Rose Street to the south, Ōpāwaho / Heathcote River to the west and Pioneer Recreation and Sport Centre to the north. It was originally a shingle pit, extending as far north as Sparks Road. Christchurch City Council purchased the land in 1937 for use as a landfill. In 1950, the city's centennial year, it was announced that the landfill was to be converted to a park. The park was opened on 10 September 1955 by Robert Macfarlane (as Mayor of Christchurch) and Mabel Howard (in her role as chairman of the Reserves Committee). A memorial plaque is placed on the corner of Lyttelton Street and Sparks Road.

Centennial Park is used predominantly as a soccer venue during the winter months, and a cricket venue during summer months.

There are a total of fifteen sports fields in the park consisting of three cricket outfields, two intermediate soccer fields, three junior soccer fields, one senior soccer field, and six touch rugby fields. The park also includes a playground, barbecue, and public toilets.

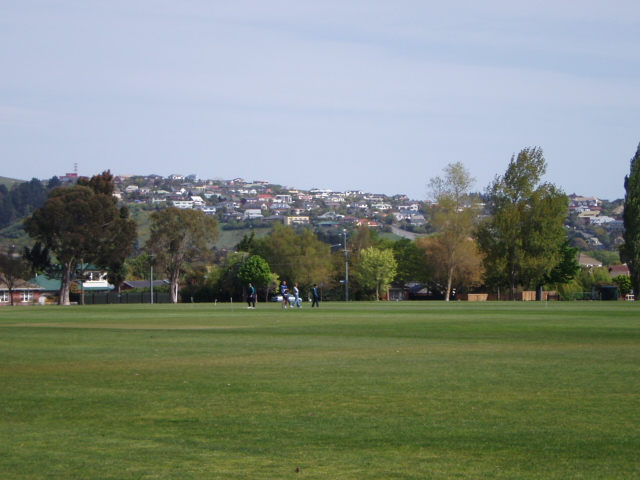

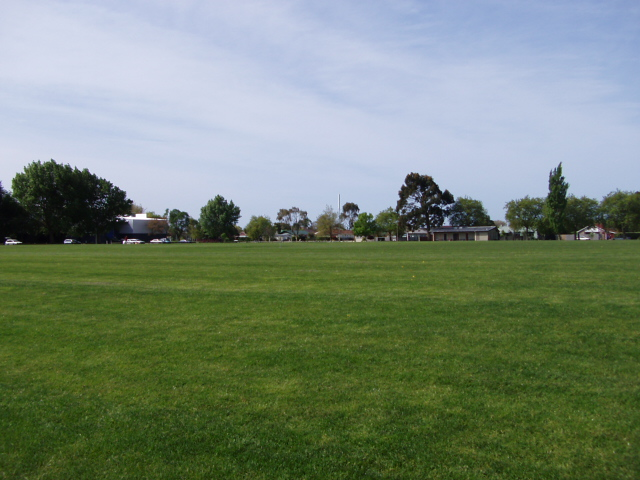

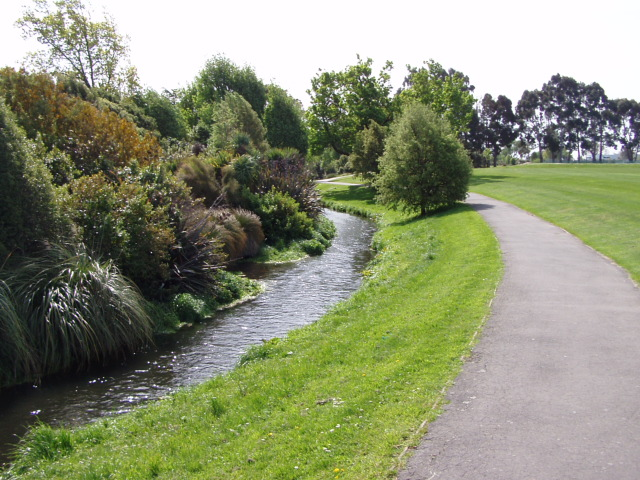

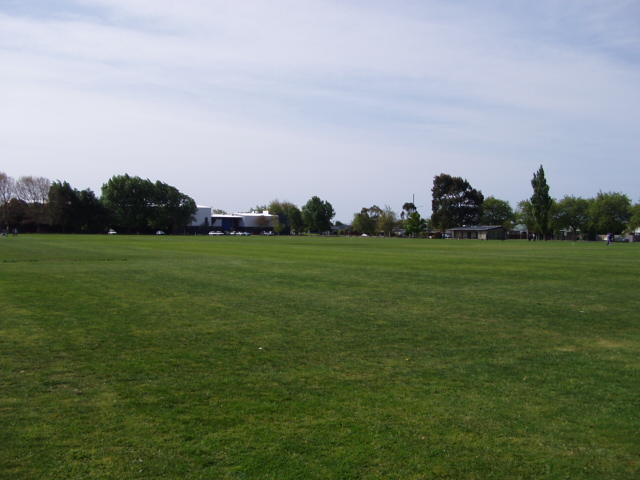

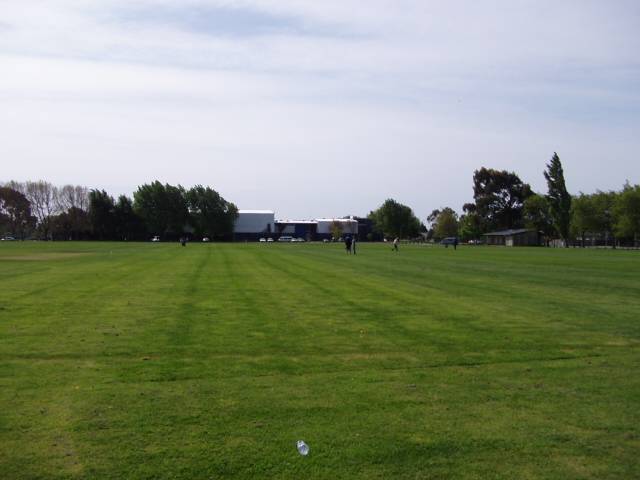

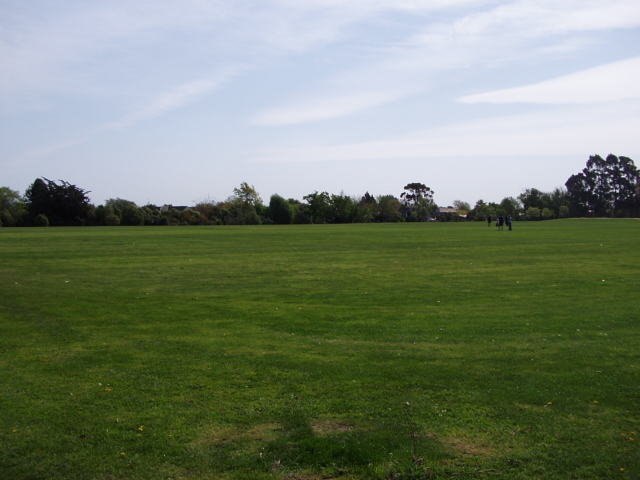
