= Centennial School District =

Centennial School District may refer to:

- Centennial School District (Minnesota)
- Centennial School District (Oregon)
- Centennial School District (Pennsylvania)

== See also ==
- Centennial Public School (Nebraska)
