= Centennial Airlines (Spain) =

Spanish charter airline

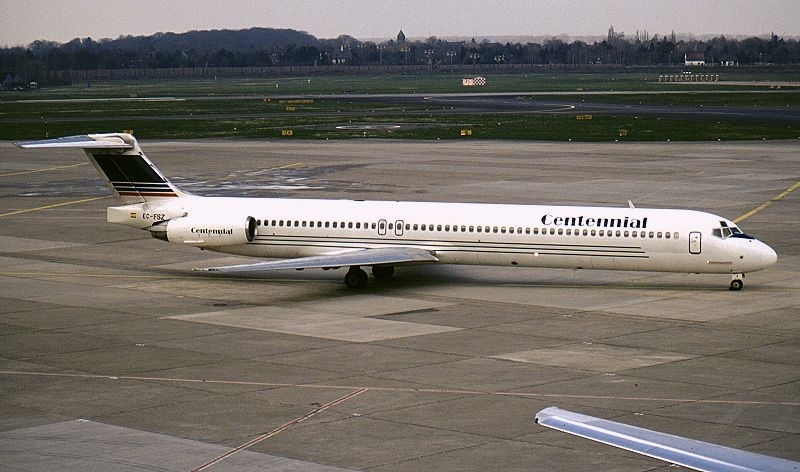
- Centennial Airlines MD-83 at Düsseldorf Airport
IATA	ICAO	Call sign
BE	CNA	-
- Commenced operations: 1993
- Ceased operations: 1996
- Operating bases: Palma de Mallorca Airport
- Fleet size: Fleet below
- Headquarters: Palma de Mallorca, Spain
- Key people: Francisco Carrión Orfila (Honorary President)

Centennial Airlines was an airline based in Palma de Mallorca, Spain.

== History ==
Centennial Airlines was founded in 1993. It operated charter services from its base in Mallorca using McDonnell Douglas MD-83 aircraft.

Owing to fierce competition from other airlines that pushed charter fares down, the airline's relatively small size compared to its Northern European competitors and the lack of significant numbers of passenger bookings during the winter season, Centennial Airlines soon faced serious financial difficulties. Centennial Airlines went bankrupt in 1995 and ceased operations in 1996.

An investigation regarding the apparent fraudulent bankruptcy of the company followed. The accused were the former administrators of Centennial Airlines SA, including its Honorary President, Francisco Carrión Orfila, a prestigious Spanish entrepreneur and former owner of the Menorca-based El Caserío cream cheese factory. Carrión was later acquitted of all charges.

== Code data ==
- ICAO code: CNA (not current)

== Fleet ==
- 9 McDonnell Douglas MD-83
