= Centennial Hall (North Hampton, New Hampshire) =

- U.S. National Register of Historic Places
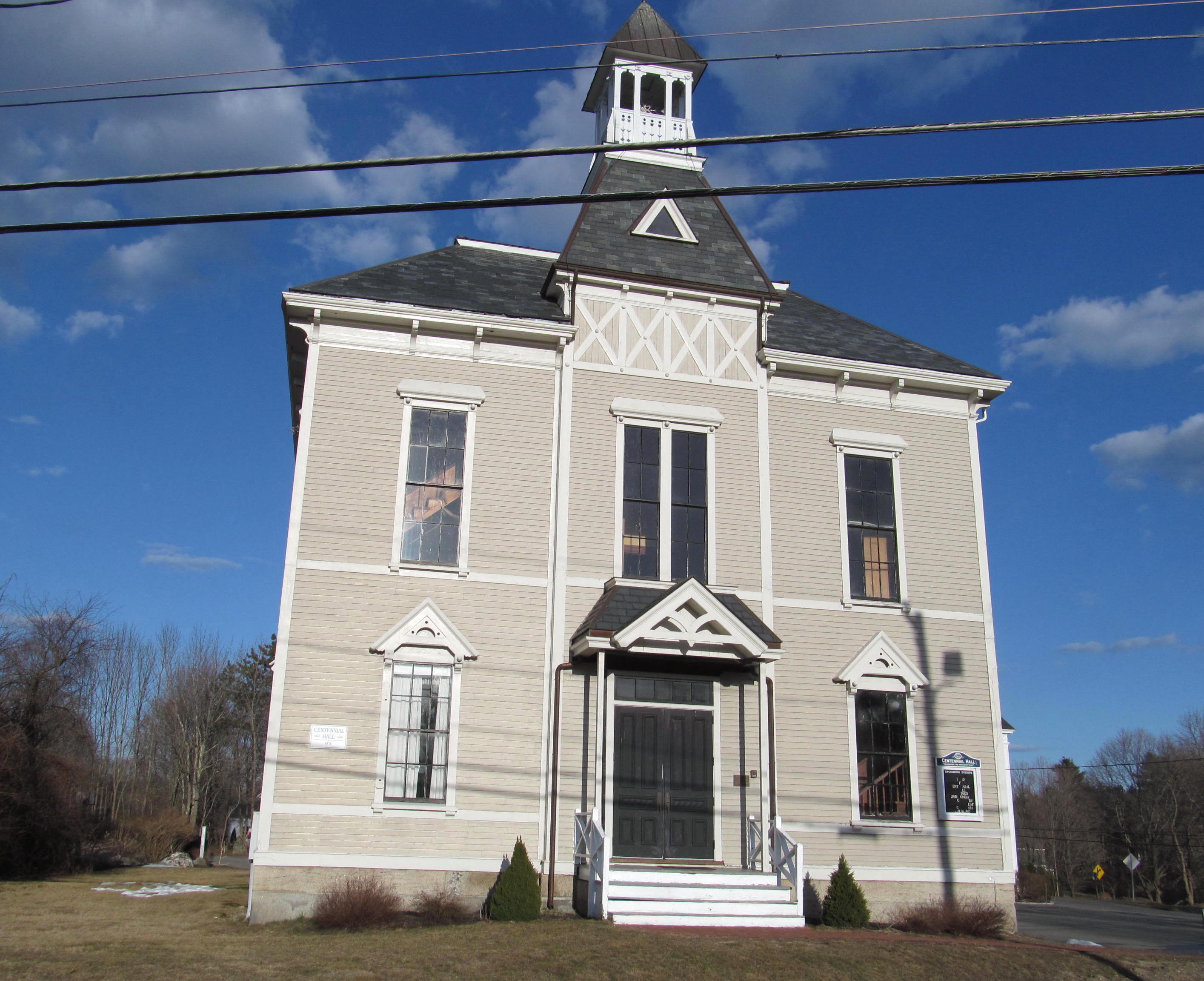

- Location within New Hampshire Location within the United States
- Location: 105 Post Rd., North Hampton, New Hampshire
- Coordinates: 42°58′43″N 70°50′45″W
- Area: Less than one acre
- Built: 1876
- Architectural style: Stick Style
- NRHP reference No.: 16000144
- Added to NRHP: April 5, 2016

Centennial Hall is a historic community hall and schoolhouse at 105 Post Road in North Hampton, New Hampshire. Built in 1876, it is a distinctive local example of Stick Style architecture, and has served the town as a schoolhouse and community meeting place for most of its existence. It was listed on the National Register of Historic Places in 2016.

== Description and history ==
Centennial Hall stands on the northeast side of the triangular town green of North Hampton, formed in part by the junction of Post Road (New Hampshire Route 151) and New Hampshire Route 111. It is set facing west, just west of the south-facing Congregational church. It is a two-story wood-frame structure, with a truncated hip roof and clapboarded exterior. It has a three-bay facade, with the center bay projecting slightly and rising to an open belfry and pyramidal cap. The roof eaves are adorned with decorative brackets, and the front of the upper portion of the tower has applied wood work in the Stick Style. Windows on the ground floor are set under jigsawn bracketed gables, and their lintels also have small brackets. The main entrance is sheltered by a hip roof portico that is fronted by a Stick style gable.

The hall was built in 1875–76, with funds donated by John W. F. Hobbs, a native son who made his fortune in Boston. The building was intended to provide new school facilities for two of the town's school districts, which then had old and overcrowded facilities. Land for the building was donated by the adjacent church. The school facilities were located on the ground floor, with a meeting hall on the second floor. A dining area was later added to the attic level. The building housed elementary and junior high students until 1949. From the 1950s to the 1980s the building was used for light industrial purposes, which brought conflict after the building was zoned into residential area. In 1998 the building was acquired by a local nonprofit organized for its preservation.

== See also ==
- National Register of Historic Places listings in Rockingham County, New Hampshire
