= Centennial, Winnipeg =

Coordinates: 49.902451°N 97.147535°W

Centennial
- Neighbourhood
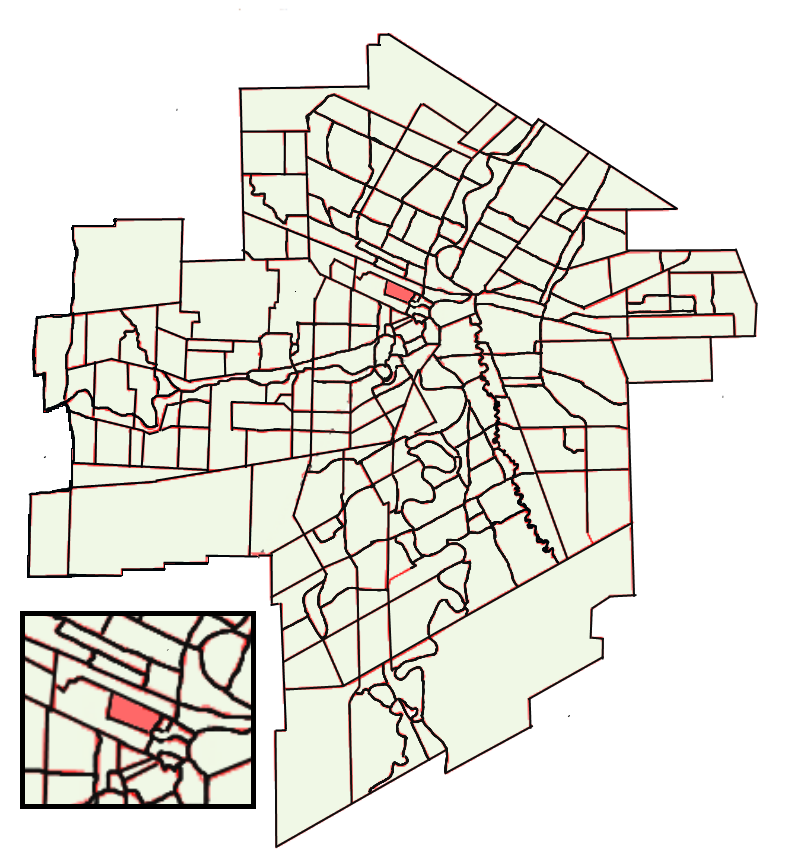
- Location of Centennial within Winnipeg
- Country: Canada
- Province: Manitoba
- City: Winnipeg

Area
  - Land: 0.5 km^{2} (0.19 sq mi)

Population (2021)
  - Total: 3,260
  - Density: 5,312.1/km^{2} (13,758/sq mi)

Racial Group
  - White: 18.8%
  - Aboriginal: 30.7%
  - Visible minority: 50.5%
- Locations Type: Location
  - Neighbourhood Cluster: Downtown East
  - Community Area: Downtown
  - Police District: District 1
  - City Council Ward: Point Douglas Ward

Centennial is an inner-city neighbourhood located Winnipeg, Manitoba, Canada, in the Downtown East Neighbourhood Cluster. The boundaries of Centennial are Sherbrook Street on the west, Logan Avenue on the north, William Avenue on the south and Stanley, Paulin and Adelaide streets on the east.

== Demographics ==
Population history
Year	Pop.	±%
1971	3,510	—
1976	2,865	−18.4%
1981	2,830	−1.2%
1986	2,980	+5.3%
1991	2,740	−8.1%
1996	2,210	−19.3%
2001	2,385	+7.9%
2006	2,225	−6.7%
2011	2,205	−0.9%
2016	2,830	+28.3%
2021	3,260	+15.2%

In 2021, the population of Centennial was 3,260, which is the highest it has been since 1971 when the population was 3,510. Centennial does not have a majority racial group as it is 30.7% Aboriginal, 18.8% White and 50.5% is made up of visible minorities, including 23.5% Black, 11.2% Filipino, and 8.0% Arab.

Canada (57%), Philippines (8%), Eritrea (5.2%), Syria (5.1%), Sudan (2.1%), and Ethiopia (2.1%) are the most common places of birth. Almost 3 in 10 of Centennial isn't a Canadian Citizen.

Centennial had a median household income of $45,600 in 2020, which was just over half of the city's at $80,000. As of 2020, there were 1,195 occupied private dwellings, 19.0% which were owned and the average dwelling is worth $198,000, significantly higher than the value in 2006, when the average was $53,440. 8.4% of these dwellings were in need of major repairs.

== Crime ==
Centennial has very high crime rates, violent crimes specifically. There were 11 homicides in the area from 2012 to 2016. In 2016, there were 36 robberies (1618.0 per 100,000 residents), 23 auto-thefts (629.2), 46 break-ins (2067.4) and 21 shootings (224.7). All of these rates are not only significantly higher than the national rates, but much higher than the city-wide rates. The robbery rate is more than 20 times the national rate (79 per 100,000 residents) and the 9th highest of all the neighborhoods in Winnipeg with populations over 1,000 residents, 15th (of 234) in total.

== Points of interest ==
=== Schools ===
- Dufferin School
- Red River College - Roblin Centre

=== Parks and playgrounds ===
- Dufferin Park
- Dufferin and Isabel park
- Lizzie Playground
- Ross Ellen Playground
- Roosevelt Playground
- Pacific Avenue Tot Lot
- Ellen and Pacific Tot Lot
- Freight House Outdoor Pool

=== Places of religion ===
- Vietnamese Mennonite Church
- Believers Church
- Amazing Grace Ministry
