= North Hampton State Beach =

Park in New Hampshire, United States

North Hampton State Park
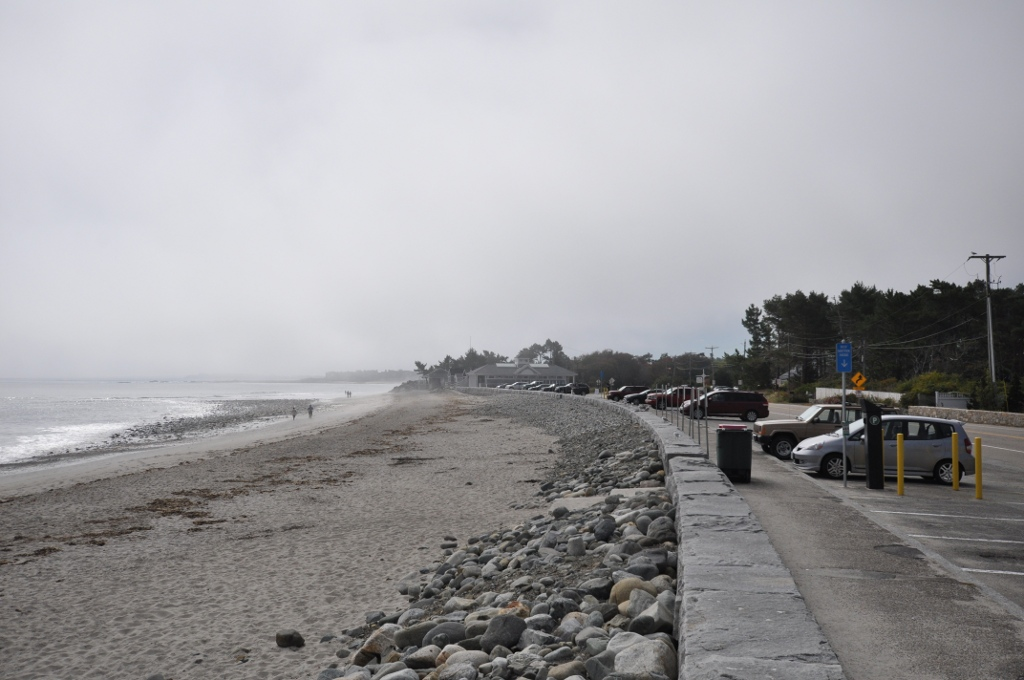

- Location within New Hampshire
- Interactive map of North Hampton State Park
- Location: North Hampton, New Hampshire, United States
- Coordinates: 42°57′13″N 70°47′01″W
- Area: 1.1 acres (0.45 ha)
- Elevation: 7 feet (2.1 m)
- Established: 1980
- Website: Official website
- New Hampshire State Parks

North Hampton State Park (also called North Hampton State Beach) is a one-acre recreation area located on the Atlantic Ocean in the town of North Hampton, New Hampshire. The park offers swimming at a sandy beach with a bathhouse and metered parking.
