= Centennial Lake (Algoma District) =

- Location in Ontario
- Location: Algoma District, Ontario
- Coordinates: 47°54′52″N 84°42′52″W
- Type: lake
- Part of: Great Lakes Basin
- Primary outflows: unnamed intermittent stream
- Basin countries: Canada
- Max. length: 220 m (720 ft)
- Max. width: 110 m (360 ft)
- Surface elevation: 301 m (988 ft)

Centennial Lake is a small lake in the Township of Wawa, Algoma District in Northeastern Ontario, Canada. It is in the Great Lakes Basin, and the primary outflow is an unnamed intermittent creek at the south. The creek flows to the Michipicoten River, which flows to Lake Superior.

== See also ==
- List of lakes in Ontario
