= Centennial Secondary School =

Centennial Secondary School can refer to:

- Brampton Centennial Secondary School, in Brampton, Ontario
- Centennial Secondary School (Coquitlam), in Coquitlam, British Columbia
- Centennial Secondary School (Belleville, Ontario), in Belleville, Ontario
- Centennial Secondary School (Windsor, Ontario), in Windsor, Ontario, closed 1985
- Welland Centennial Secondary School, in Welland, Ontario
