= Newfields (CDP), New Hampshire =

Census-designated place in New Hampshire, United States

Newfields, New Hampshire
- Census-designated place
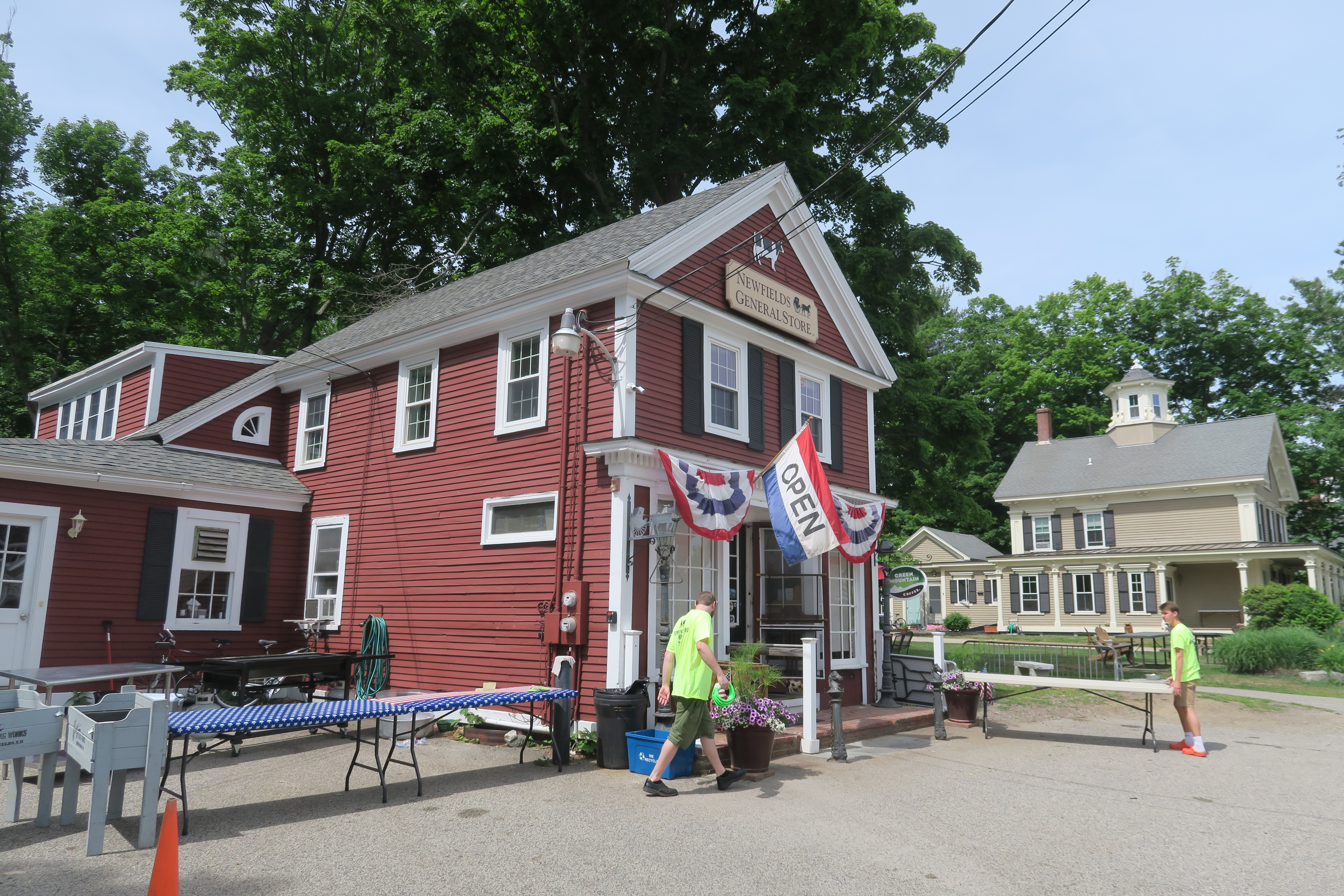
- Newfields General Store

- Location within New Hampshire Location within the United States
- Coordinates: 43°02′08″N 70°56′21″W
- Country: United States
- State: New Hampshire
- County: Rockingham
- Town: Newfields

Area
  - Total: 0.38 sq mi (0.98 km^{2})
  - Land: 0.38 sq mi (0.98 km^{2})
  - Water: 0 sq mi (0.00 km^{2})
- Elevation: 49 ft (15 m)

Population (2020)
  - Total: 378
  - Density: 994.6/sq mi (384.02/km^{2})
- Time zone: UTC-5 (Eastern (EST))
  - Summer (DST): UTC-4 (EDT)
- ZIP code: 03856
- Area code: 603
- FIPS code: 33-51300
- GNIS feature ID: 2629731

Newfields is a census-designated place (CDP) and the main village within the town of Newfields, New Hampshire, United States. The population of the CDP was 378 at the 2020 census, out of 1,769 in the entire town.

== Geography ==
The CDP is on the eastern edge of the town of Newfields, along the west side of the Squamscott River, which forms the town line with Stratham. The CDP extends south along the river to Parting Brook and north along it to an unnamed brook west of New Hampshire Route 108. To the west the CDP reaches to the east end of Meadow Road at New Hampshire Route 87.

New Hampshire Route 85 passes through the center of the community as Main Street; it leads northeast 0.8 miles (1.3 km) to Route 108 and south 4 miles (6 km) to the center of Exeter. Durham is 8 miles (13 km) to the north via Routes 85 and 108. Route 87 (Piscassic Road) leads west from Newfields 6 miles (10 km) to Route 125 in Epping.

According to the U.S. Census Bureau, the Newfields CDP has a total area of 0.39 square miles (1.0 km^{2}), all land.

== Demographics ==
Historical population
| Census | Pop. | Note | %± |
|---|---|---|---|
| 2010 | 301 | | — |
| 2020 | 378 | | 25.6% |
U.S. Decennial Census

As of the census of 2010, there were 301 people, 120 households, and 86 families residing in the CDP. There were 130 housing units, of which 10, or 7.7%, were vacant. The racial makeup of the CDP was 99.7% white and 0.3% "some other race". 0.7% of the population were Hispanic or Latino of any race.

Of the 120 households in the CDP, 33.3% had children under the age of 18 living with them, 65.0% were headed by married couples living together, 4.2% had a female householder with no husband present, and 28.3% were non-families. 22.5% of all households were made up of individuals, and 5.8% were someone living alone who was 65 years of age or older. The average household size was 2.51, and the average family size was 3.01.

23.9% of residents in the CDP were under the age of 18, 6.4% were from age 18 to 24, 22.6% were from 25 to 44, 36.5% were from 45 to 64, and 10.6% were 65 years of age or older. The median age was 43.6 years. For every 100 females, there were 102.0 males. For every 100 females age 18 and over, there were 106.3 males.

For the period 2011–15, the estimated median annual income for a household was $81,250, and the median income for a family was $104,250. The per capita income for the CDP was $38,566. 2.8% of the population and 2.4% of families were below the poverty line, along with 4.9% of people under the age of 18 and 0.0% of people 65 or older.
