= William Badger (disambiguation) =

William Badger (1779–1852) was an American manufacturer and governor of New Hampshire.

William Badger may also refer to:

- William Badger (died 1629), member of parliament (MP) for Winchester
- William Badger (died 1578), MP for Cricklade
- William Badger (shipbuilder) (1752–1830), master shipbuilder operating in Kittery, Maine, United States who built more than 100 vessels
- William R. Badger (1886–1911), pioneer aviator
- William Thompson Badger (1884–1926), politician in Saskatchewan, Canada
- USS William Badger, a whaler acquired by the Union Navy during the American Civil War
- Bill Badger, fictional character from Bill Badger and the Pirates
