= NH 85 =

NH 85 may refer to:

- National Highway 85 (India)
- New Hampshire Route 85, United States
