= Samuel Badger Monument =

- U.S. National Register of Historic Places
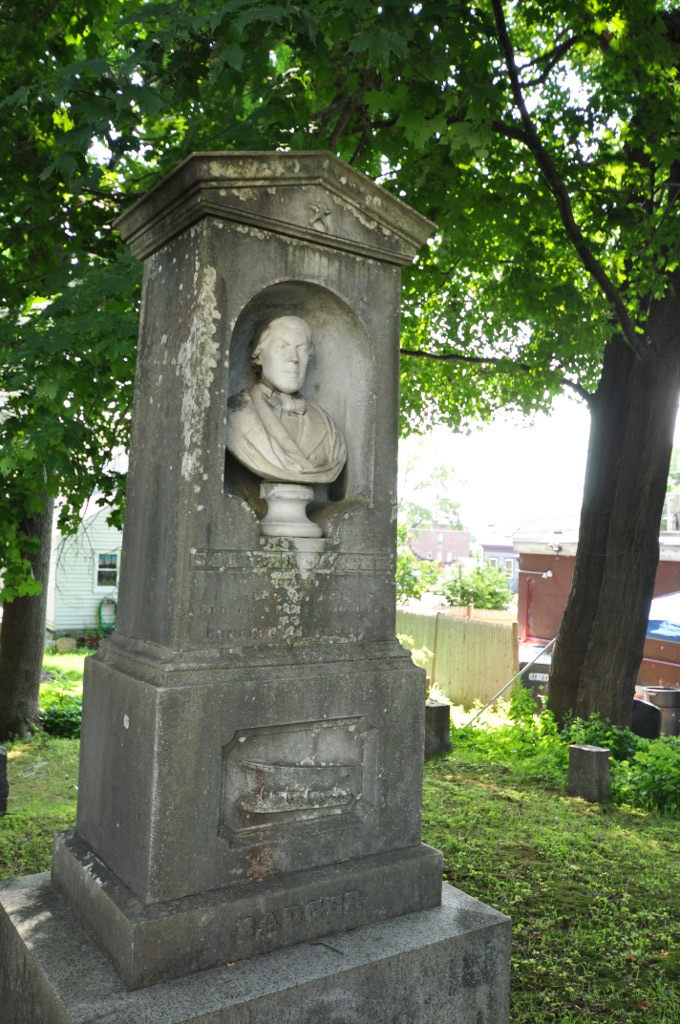

- Location within Maine Location within the United States
- Location: Kittery Foreside, Maine
- Area: less than one acre
- Built: 1858
- Architect: French, David M.
- NRHP reference No.: 97001640
- Added to NRHP: January 7, 1998

The Samuel Badger Monument is one of the most distinctive examples of funerary art in the US state of Maine. Located in a small private cemetery in Kittery, it depicts the locally important shipbuilding magnate Samuel Badger (1794-1857). The monument was designed by David M. French of Newmarket, New Hampshire, and was completed in 1858. It was listed on the National Register of Historic Places in 1998.

== Description and history ==
The Samuel Badger Monument is located in a small private cemetery in a residential area of Kittery Foreside, a village of Kittery on the banks of the Piscataqua River, not far from Badger's Island. The cemetery has a small number of graves, which all appear to be related to Samuel Badger and his immediate family, many of whom predeceased him. The cemetery is surrounded by houses, and is not readily accessible to the public. The monument is a stepped rectangular granite shaft, set on a granite foundation. In a niche on one side with a curved ceiling stands a marble bust of Badger. The tier at the base of the shaft has the Badger name in raised letters, and the next tier depicts a 19th-century sailing ship. The shaft is topped by a low gabled pediment with a star at its center. The bust of Badger was designed by David M. French of Newmarket, New Hampshire, and was installed in 1858. The circumstances of its commissioning are not known.

Samuel Badger was one of the major shipbuilders on the Piscataqua River in the mid-19th century. He was the nephew of William Badger, a shipbuilder for whom Badger's Island is named. He served for many years under his uncle at his shipyard, and took over that business upon the elder Badger's death in 1830. From then until his own death in 1857, the Badger shipyard produced 45 packet ships.

== See also ==
- National Register of Historic Places listings in York County, Maine
