= Bavarian Autosport =

- Trade name: Bavarian Auto Service, Inc.
- Industry: Car parts
- Founded: 1974 in Stratham, United States
- Defunct: March 8, 2019
- Fate: Closed
- Headquarters: Portsmouth, New Hampshire., USA
- Number of locations: 1
- Products: Replacement parts, upgrades and accessories for BMW and MINI automobiles

Bavarian Autosport was the trade name of Bavarian Auto Service, Inc., an award-winning mail-order and internet retailer of replacement parts, upgrades and accessories for BMW and MINI automobiles. It had one retail store at its headquarters in Portsmouth, New Hampshire.

== History ==
Bavarian Auto Service was founded in 1974 as an automotive service center specializing in the repair and modification of BMW automobiles. Its first location was in Stratham, New Hampshire. In 1977 it moved to Newmarket, New Hampshire. In addition to repair services, the company began to offer an inventory of new and used parts that BMW enthusiasts in the northeastern United States could purchase to do their own repairs and modifications. In the late 1970s, it began to advertise its BMW parts and accessories throughout North America. In 1983 it produced its first catalog. In 1996 the company moved to Portsmouth, New Hampshire, where it had built a three-story warehouse. That same year it began operating under the name Bavarian Autosport.

The company's website was launched in 1996. It became an e-commerce site in 2001. When BMW launched the new MINI in 2002, the company began offering parts and accessories for MINIs as well. In 2003, the company launched a quarterly newsletter that contains step-by-step do-it-yourself repairs, in-depth product features and a technical Q&A with “Bavarian Otto”, a cartoon character developed to make automotive repairs and maintenance seem less intimidating. In 2008, the company started posting many of these Q&A online at blog.BavAuto.com, a searchable, online knowledgebase that now contains more than 1,000 Q&A and dozens of D.I.Y. videos. As of 2016, Bavarian Autosport was still owned and operated by the three friends who founded the company.

== Closure ==
On March 8, 2019, Bavarian Autosport announced via its Facebook page that after 45 years in business, they would be closing their doors.
