= Grace Lincoln Temple =

American interior designer (1865–1953)

Grace Lincoln Temple (1865–1953), was an American interior designer and one of the first women to decorate a public U.S. building. Temple designed the Smithsonian Institution rotunda and its first Children's Room in 1901, in addition to a variety of federal World's Fair buildings, the Cosmos Club, several presidential inaugurations, and the White House East Room under the Cleveland administration. Temple was an expert in Colonial wallpaper design and ran a successful decorating practice in Washington, D.C. for fifty years.

== Early life ==
Temple was born in 1865 in Boston, Massachusetts to parents Stephen and Hannah Temple. Grace was one of three children, with an older brother, Walter, and younger brother, Jason. She was a graduate of the Boston Art Museum School, and studied under architect and designer Charles Howard Walker. After graduation, she worked as an art teacher in Cleveland, before relocating to Washington, D.C. in the 1890s.

== Career ==
=== Designs for presidents ===
Temple worked with U.S. presidential administrations on designs for inauguration events and White House redesigns. Temple was on the decorating committees for the inaugurations of both Theodore Roosevelt (1905) and William Howard Taft (1909).

After being commissioned by the Cleveland administration to redecorate the East Room, First Lady Frances Cleveland Preston hired Temple to redecorate the couple's home in Princeton, N.J. Frances Cleveland wanted their traditional Colonial home's interior redesigned before their family returned to New Jersey at the end of President Cleveland's second term. The First Lady wanted the house's interior design to "be treated in the fashion of that [Colonial] period." Throughout the winter of 1896 and into 1897, Frances Cleveland hired Temple to work on the redesign, and traveled often to Temple's studio to look over design samples.

=== Designs for the World's Fair ===
In 1895, Temple worked on decorating the Women's Building at the Cotton States and International Exposition in Atlanta. She later became the only woman in charge of decorating a building during the 1904 World's Fair, when she was in charge of interior design for the United States government building. Temple led a team of 25 decorators and was actively involved in both the conceptual design and its execution, down to how the paint was mixed and applied. She was paid $15,000 for her work.

The interior of the building was done in shades of red, white, and blue, with a large frieze of the U.S. shield. The shield was surrounded with an oval of thirteen stars, representing the first thirteen colonies. The United States flag and eagle designs were incorporated throughout the building. Temple's design set it apart from other World's Fair buildings, as it was the only one to use the architectural design of the building as part of the interior design.

=== Designs for the Smithsonian ===
Temple, who had previously designed the Smithsonian rotunda, was hired to design the museum's first Children's Room in 1901. Acting Smithsonian Secretary Samuel Pierpont Langley (honorary curator of the new children's space) wanted a "cozy, pleasant room, with plenty of light and pretty things," and commissioned Temple to create a design aesthetic that matched.

Temple created a bright, stenciled wallpaper frieze of birds for the walls—a hand-drawn stenciling process that was rare and time consuming. She also designed the room's fresco ceiling, depicting a leafy trellis and clear, open sky. Looking down on the room, Temple painted colorful birds, mirroring both the live and taxidermy birds in the exhibit space. The overall room was painted in shades of green with gilded moldings.

The Children Room, under Langley's vision and Temple's design, was well-received, described in the press as a “very bright and cheery apartment...among the dim old rooms of the Smithsonian Institution.”

== Later life ==
Temple appeared frequently as a speaker at women's societies and universities throughout Washington, D.C. She often lectured on art history, particularly colonial wallpaper design, her specialty. She also conducted restoration work for the Museum of Fine Arts, Boston (then called Boston Museum of Art).

Temple also served as the inaugural Chairman of the Decorating Committee for the American Federation of Arts in 1909. While a leader with the AFA, she worked on a project to bring artwork into D.C. public schools, with a goal of inspiring children to learn more about art and visit museum collections.
