= NH 87 =

NH 87 may refer to:

- National Highway 87 (India)
- New Hampshire Route 87, United States
