= New Hampshire Route 85 =

State highway in Rockingham County, New Hampshire, US

New Hampshire Route 85
- Map of Rockingham County in southeastern New Hampshire with NH 85 highlighted in red

Route information
- Maintained by NHDOT
- Length: 4.854 mi (7.812 km)

Major junctions
- South end: NH 27 / NH 111A in Exeter
- NH 101 in Exeter
- North end: NH 108 in Newfields

Location
- Country: United States
- State: New Hampshire
- Counties: Rockingham

Highway system
- New Hampshire Highway System; Interstate; US; State; Turnpikes
← NH 84	→ NH 87

New Hampshire Route 85 (abbreviated NH Route 85 or NH 85) is a 4.854-mile-long (7.812 km) north–south state highway in Rockingham County in southeastern New Hampshire. It runs from Exeter to Newfields.

The southern terminus of NH 85 is in downtown Exeter at New Hampshire Route 27 and New Hampshire Route 111A. The northern terminus is in Newfields at New Hampshire Route 108.

It runs along the west side of the Squamscott River for its entire length, opposite to NH 108, which runs east of the river.

== Route description ==
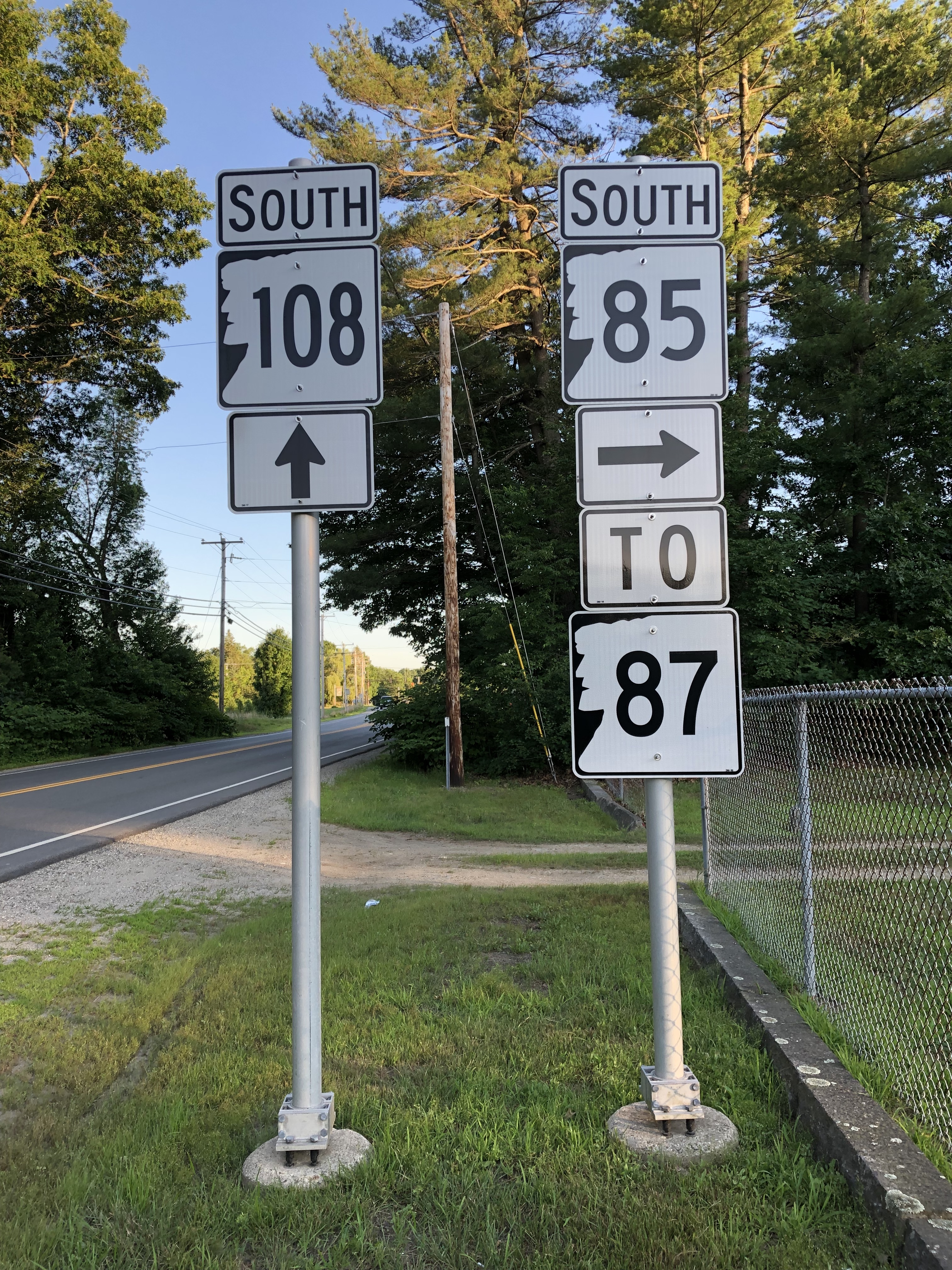
Signage for the northern terminus of NH 85, as seen along NH 108 in Newfields

NH 85 begins just west of downtown Exeter, at the intersection of Water Street and Main Street, although no signage is present. Heading westbound on Water Street, which initially carries NH 27 and NH 111A, these two routes transition over to Main Street, while Water Street splits off due north to carry NH 85. On its way out of town, NH 85 interchanges with the Exeter-Hampton Expressway (NH 101) at exit 10, before entering the town of Newfields. Continuing northbound, NH 85 intersects the eastern terminus of NH 87, a short route connecting with NH 125 in northern Epping. The road turns northeast for its last mile and ends at an intersection with NH 108, which provides access to the closely neighboring towns of Newmarket and Stratham.

== Junction list ==
The entire route is in Rockingham County.

Location	mi	km	Destinations	Notes
Exeter	0.000	0.000	NH 27 / NH 111A (Main Street/Water Street) to NH 108 / NH 111 – Epping, Hampton	Southern terminus
Exeter	1.449– 1.534	2.332– 2.469	NH 101 (Exeter–Hampton Expressway) – Manchester, Hampton	Exit 10 on NH 101
Newfields	4.011	6.455	NH 87 west (Piscassic Road) – Epping	Eastern terminus of NH 87
Newfields	4.854	7.812	NH 108 (College Road) – Newmarket, Stratham	Northern terminus
1.000 mi = 1.609 km; 1.000 km = 0.621 mi
