= New Hampshire Route 87 =

State highway in Rockingham County, New Hampshire, US

New Hampshire Route 87
- Map of Rockingham County in southeastern New Hampshire with NH 87 highlighted in red

Route information
- Maintained by NHDOT
- Length: 6.317 mi (10.166 km)

Major junctions
- West end: NH 125 near Epping
- East end: NH 85 in Newfields

Location
- Country: United States
- State: New Hampshire
- Counties: Rockingham

Highway system
- New Hampshire Highway System; Interstate; US; State; Turnpikes
← NH 85	→ NH 88

New Hampshire Route 87 is a 6.317-mile-long (10.166 km) east–west highway in Rockingham County in southeastern New Hampshire connecting Newfields to Epping. The eastern terminus of NH 87 is in Newfields at its junction with New Hampshire Route 85. The western terminus is in Epping at its junction with New Hampshire Route 125.

== Route description ==
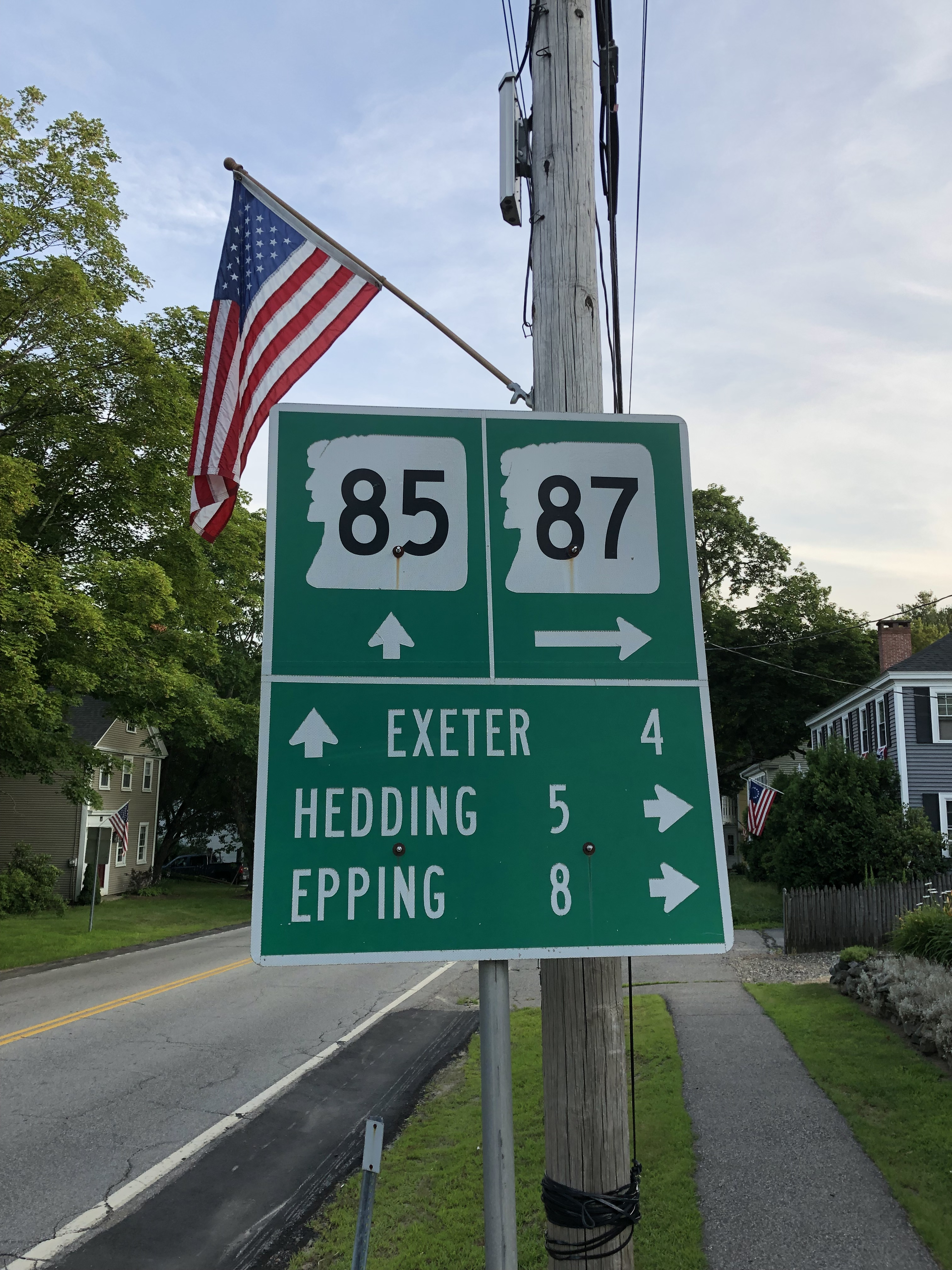
Signage for the eastern terminus of NH 87, as seen along NH 85 in Newfields

NH 87 begins in the west at NH 125 in Epping, north of downtown. The highway proceeds eastward out of town and crosses into Newfields. NH 87 continues to the town center of Newfields, where it ends at an intersection with NH 85 near the Squamscott River.

In Newfields, the highway is known locally as Piscassic Road. In Epping, the highway is known locally as Hedding Road.

== Junction list ==
The entire route is in Rockingham County.

Location	mi	km	Destinations	Notes
Epping	0.000	0.000	NH 125 (Calef Highway) – Brentwood, Lee	Western terminus
Newfields	6.317	10.166	NH 85 (Main Street / Exeter Road) to NH 108 – Newfields, Exeter	Eastern terminus
1.000 mi = 1.609 km; 1.000 km = 0.621 mi
