= John Crockett House =

Historic house in New Hampshire, United States

- U.S. National Register of Historic Places
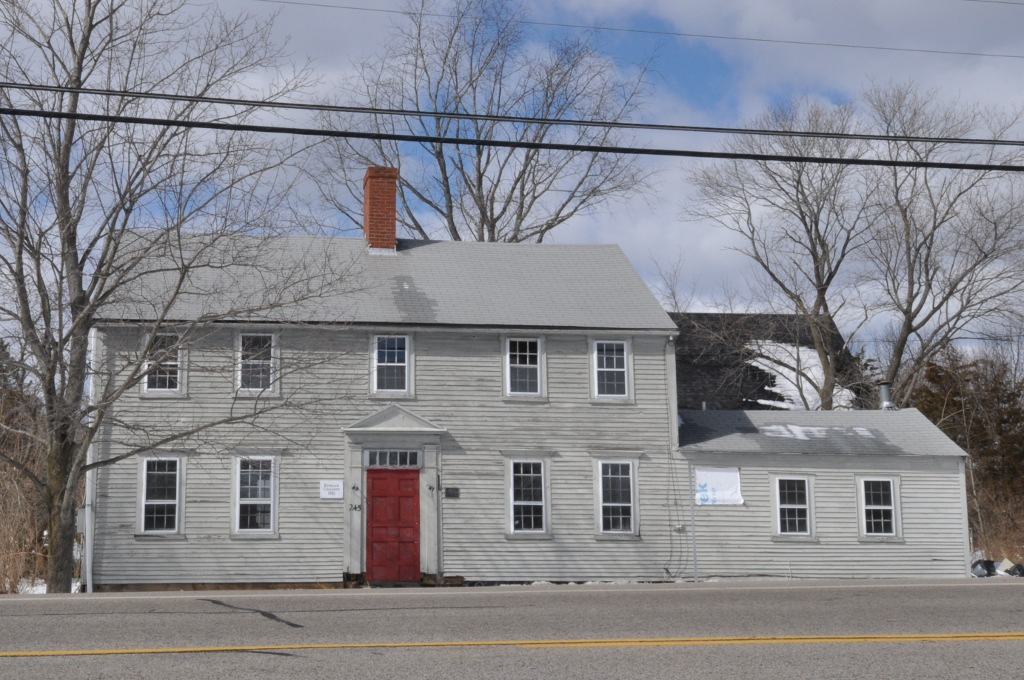

- Location within New Hampshire Location within the United States
- Location: 245 Portsmouth Rd., Stratham, New Hampshire
- Coordinates: 43°2′26″N 70°53′59″W
- Area: 1 acre (0.40 ha)
- Built: 1760
- Built by: Crockett, Ephraim; Crockett, John
- Architectural style: Georgian
- NRHP reference No.: 83001144
- Added to NRHP: March 24, 1983

The John Crockett House, also known as Kenniston's Tavern, is a historic house at 245 Portsmouth Road (New Hampshire Route 33) in Stratham, New Hampshire in the United States. Built about 1760, it is a well-preserved example of Georgian residential architecture. It was operated for a time as a tavern serving travelers on the main road between Portsmouth and Exeter. The house was listed on the National Register of Historic Places in 1983.

== Description and history ==
The John Crockett House stands in northern Stratham, on the north side of Portsmouth Road, between Depot Road and Jason Drive. It is a 2 1/2-story wood-frame structure, with a gabled roof, central roof, and clapboarded exterior. It is five bays wide and two deep, with a center entrance framed by pilasters and a pedimented gable. A single-story ell extends to the right side. The interior follows a typical Georgian period plan, with a narrow central hall flanked by parlor spaces.

The house was built c. 1760 by Ephraim Crockett and his son John around the time of the latter's marriage. Both Crocketts, as well as Ephraim's father Richard, were prominent local builders, so the construction of this house may shed significant light on the evolution of local building practices. The house was purchased in 1780 by Henry Kenniston, a tailor who converted the house into an inn, capitalizing on its location midway between Portsmouth and Exeter. It served as an inn, operated by Kenniston's descendants, until 1883.

== See also ==
- National Register of Historic Places listings in Rockingham County, New Hampshire
