= William Fogg Library =

- U.S. National Register of Historic Places
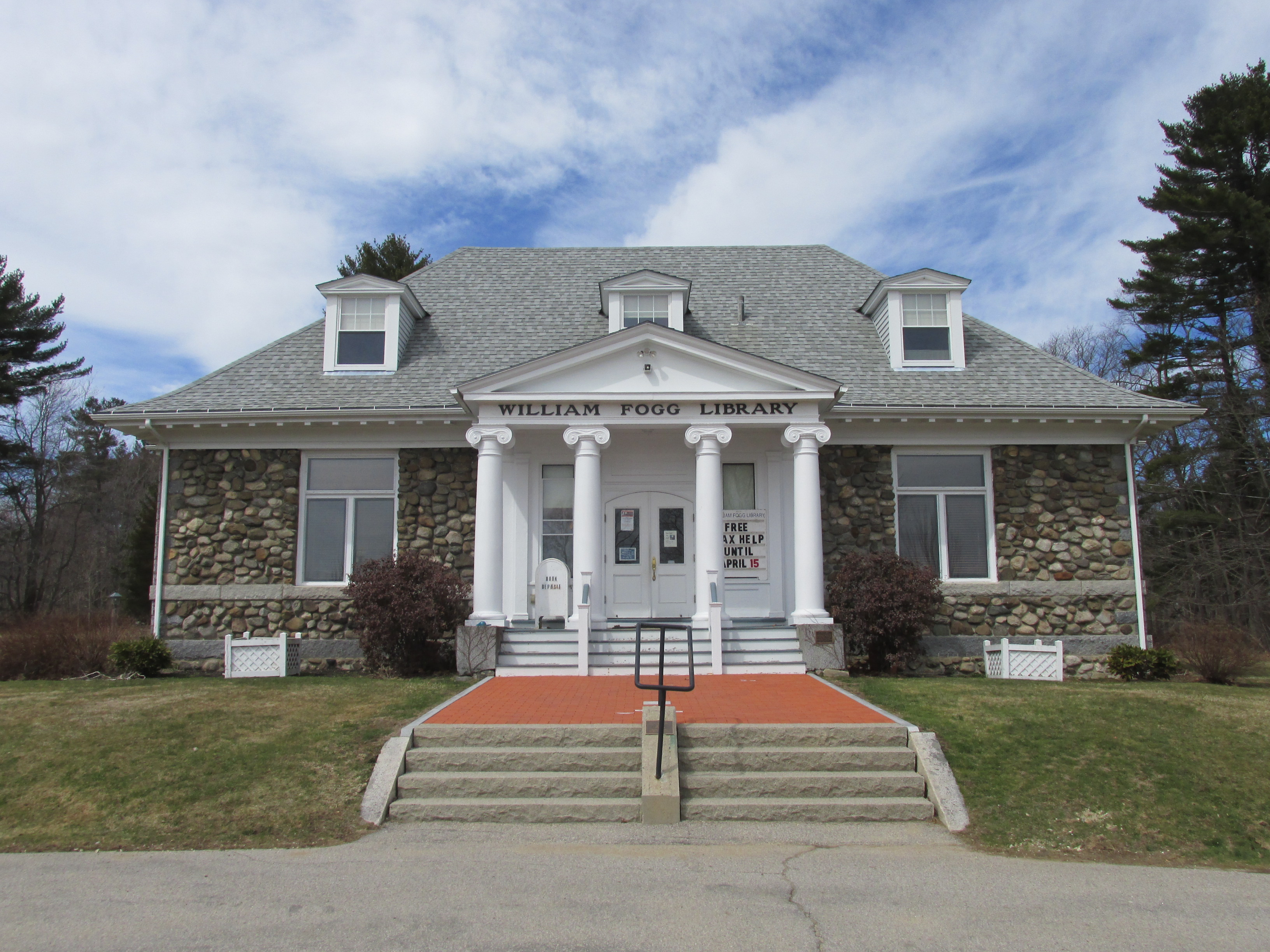
- William Fogg Library

- Location within Maine Location within the United States
- Nearest city: Eliot, Maine
- Coordinates: 43°7′42″N 70°47′53″W
- Area: 3.5 acres (1.4 ha)
- Built: 1907
- Built by: Moulton, Otis
- Architect: Walker, C. Howard
- Architectural style: Colonial Revival
- MPS: Maine Public Libraries MPS
- NRHP reference No.: 91001817
- Added to NRHP: December 21, 1991

The William Fogg Library is the public library of Eliot, Maine. It is located at the junction of Old and State Roads, in an architecturally distinguished building constructed in 1907 via a bequest from Dr. John S. H. Fogg in memory of his father William. The building was designed by C. Howard Walker, and was listed on the National Register of Historic Places on December 21, 1991.

== Architecture and history ==
The Fogg Library is set at the northwest corner of Old and State Roads (Old Road being designated Maine State Route 103), near the northern end of Eliot's linear village center. It is a 1 1/2-story structure fashioned out of fieldstone, with a flared hip roof, set on a low hill on a triangular lot. Its distinctive exterior and elevated position adjacent to the main road make it a prominent local landmark. Its main facade is three bays wide, with a center entrance portico supported by four Ionic columns, with an entablature and fully pedimented gable above. The roof has three gabled dormers, and there are granite string courses above the foundation and below the windows. The interior has a central hall, with a reading room on one side and children's room on the other, and stacks located in an ell to the rear. The interior is relatively little altered since its construction.

The first library established in the town Eliot was a private lending library established by William Fogg and housed at his home on Old Road. Fogg's son, Dr. John H. S. Fogg, a Harvard-educated doctor, continued his father's interest in education, amassing a collection of books. Upon his death he gave most of his book collection to the town, and bequested $10,000 to the town for construction of a library on land he donated. The new library was built in 1907, to a design by Boston architect C. Howard Walker, and supposedly used stone materials gathered from the walls lining the Fogg property. Fogg also established a trust fund for maintenance of the building.

== See also ==
- National Register of Historic Places listings in York County, Maine
