= Wiggin Memorial Library =

American library in New Hampshire

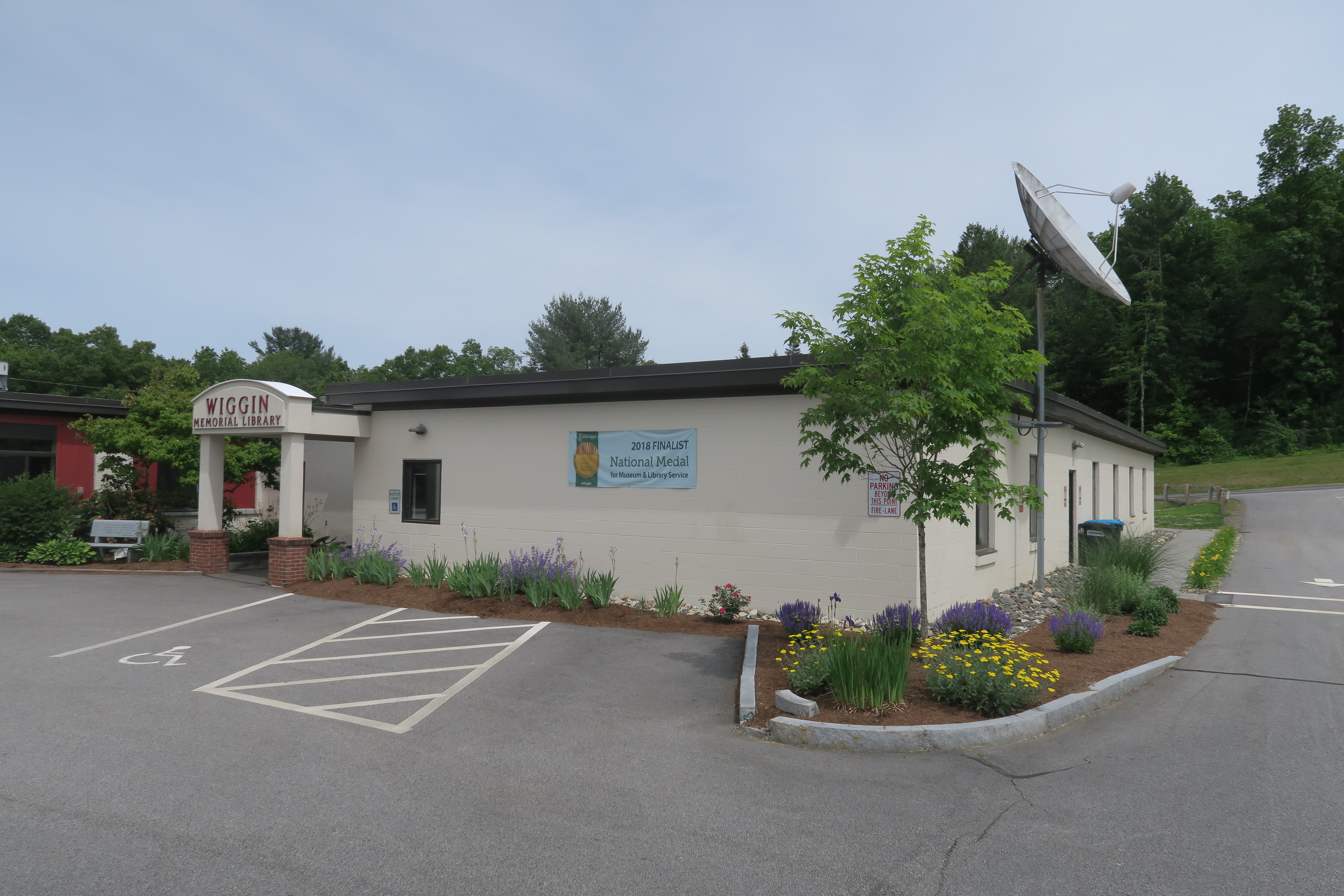
- Library building exterior in 2018
- 43.010969°N 70.915086°W
- Location: 10 Bunker Hill Avenue, Stratham, New Hampshire, United States
- Type: Public library
- Established: 1912 (former building); 1989 (current building)

Other information
- Director: Lesley Kimball (as of November 2020)
- Website: www.library.strathamnh.gov

The Wiggin Memorial Library is the public library of Stratham, New Hampshire. It is located at 10 Bunker Hill Avenue.

== History ==
Stratham had private libraries since 1793, and began to financially support the last of these in 1896. In 1912, a dedicated library building was built at 158 Portsmouth Avenue, which served as the town's public library until 1989, when it moved to its current facilities. The former library building, listed on the National Register of Historic Places since 1993, now serves as a research library and meeting place for the Stratham Historical Society. The current Wiggin Memorial Library building is located at 10 Bunker Hill Avenue.

In March 2018, the library was named one of 14 library finalists for the National Medal for Museum and Library Service, the highest honor given to museums and libraries for service in the community, awarded by the Institute of Museum and Library Services in Washington, D.C.
