= Emery Farm (Stratham, New Hampshire) =

Historic house in New Hampshire, United States

- U.S. National Register of Historic Places
- Location within New Hampshire Location within the United States
- Location: 16 Emery Ln., Stratham, New Hampshire
- Coordinates: 43°1′1″N 70°55′1″W
- Built: 1740
- Architectural style: Georgian, Federal, Greek Revival
- NRHP reference No.: 100001621
- Added to NRHP: September 18, 2017

Emery Farm is a historic farm property at 16 Emery Lane in Stratham, New Hampshire. The farmhouse, built about 1740, is a fine example of period architecture, with later 19th century stylistic alterations. The property is notable as one of New Hampshire's first market garden farms, a practice adopted by John Emery in 1855. The property was listed on the National Register of Historic Places in 2017.

== Description and history ==
Emery Farm is located in the dispersed center of Stratham, on the west side of Emery Lane, a former through road now bypassed by Portsmouth Street (New Hampshire Route 108) just to the east. The property includes a large house and barn. The house is a large 2 1/2-story wood-frame structure, with a gabled roof, central brick chimney, and clapboarded exterior. Windows are framed by simple moulded trim, while the centered entrance is framed by pilasters and a corniced entablature. Its interior follows a typical center-chimney plan, with a narrow vestibule that has a winding staircase, and parlor spaces to either side of the chimney. A two-story ell extends to the rear. The barn is a large 19th-century structure, with an attached corn crib, several animal stalls, and space used historically as living space by farmhands.

The main block of the house was built about 1740, and in its early years served as Chase's Tavern, a meeting place at which civic and commercial activity took place in the rural community. It was enlarged by the Emery family to accommodate several generations. In 1855 John Emery began producing cash crop vegetables, which he sold door-to-door in communities from Dover to Portsmouth. This is believed to be the first instance of market garden farming in the state, and the practice spread to a number of Stratham's other farms. Emery is also credited with introducing fresh strawberries to Portsmouth, something that had otherwise been a scarce commodity. The property continued to be used for many years as a market garden farm by Emery's son John Fred Emery.

== See also ==
- National Register of Historic Places listings in Rockingham County, New Hampshire
