= Newfields, New Hampshire =

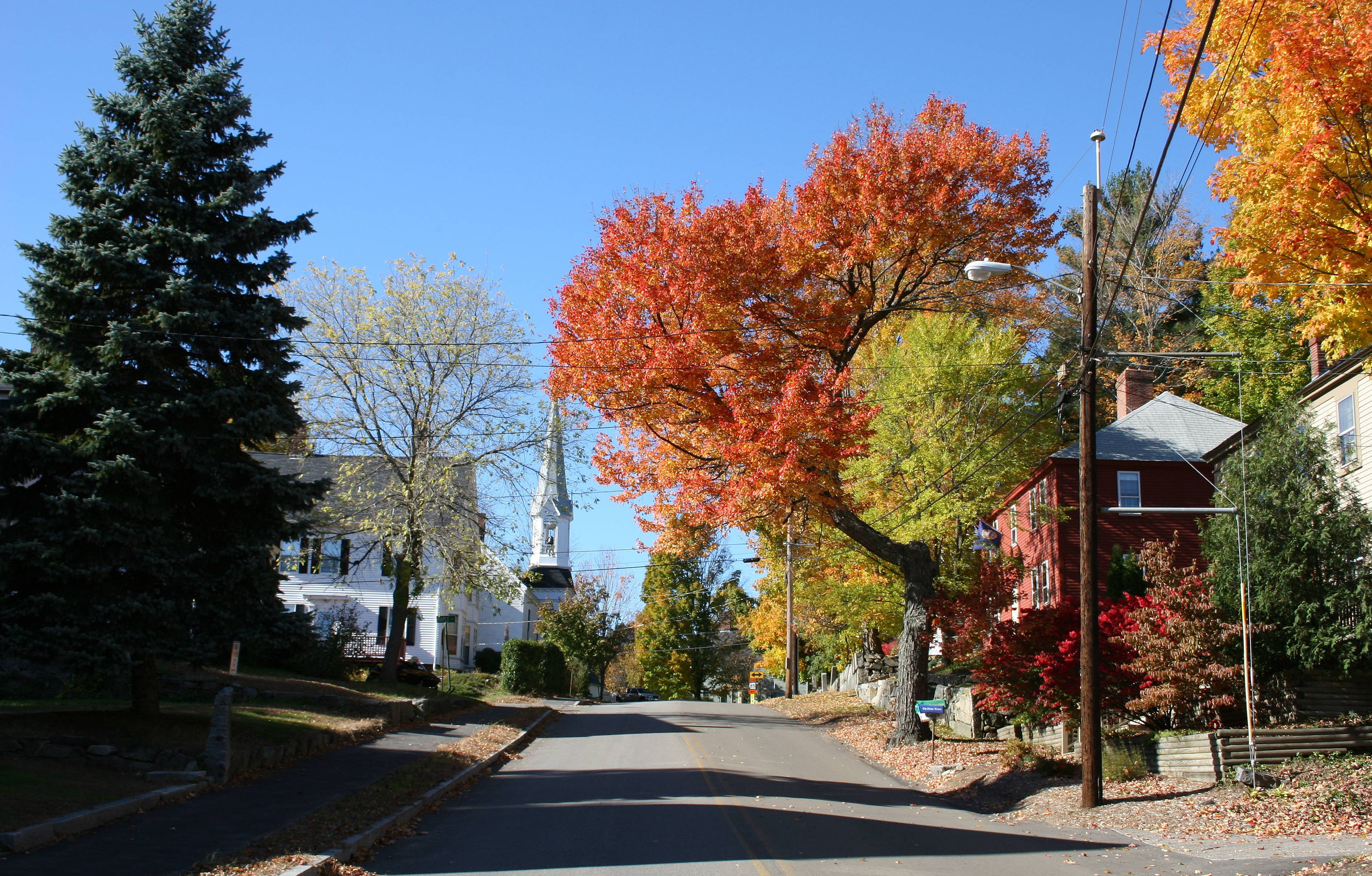
- Swamscott Street

- Seal

- Location in Rockingham County and the state of New Hampshire.
- Coordinates: 43°02′21″N 70°57′59″W
- Country: United States
- State: New Hampshire
- County: Rockingham
- Incorporated: 1849
- Villages: Newfields; Littlefield

Area
  - Total: 7.3 sq mi (18.8 km^{2})
  - Land: 7.1 sq mi (18.4 km^{2})
  - Water: 0.15 sq mi (0.4 km^{2}) 2.31%
- Elevation: 75 ft (23 m)

Population (2020)
  - Total: 1,769
  - Density: 249/sq mi (96.3/km^{2})
- Time zone: UTC-5 (Eastern)
  - Summer (DST): UTC-4 (Eastern)
- ZIP code: 03856
- Area code: 603
- FIPS code: 33-51380
- GNIS feature ID: 873678
- Website: www.newfieldsnh.gov

Newfields is a town in Rockingham County, New Hampshire, United States. The population was 1,769 at the 2020 census. The primary village in town, where 378 people resided at the 2020 census, is defined as the Newfields census-designated place (CDP) and is located along New Hampshire Route 85 and the Squamscott River. It is a quaint village of handsome old houses.

Newfields is one of New Hampshire's wealthiest towns, with a median household income of $154,375 for the period 2015–19.

== History ==
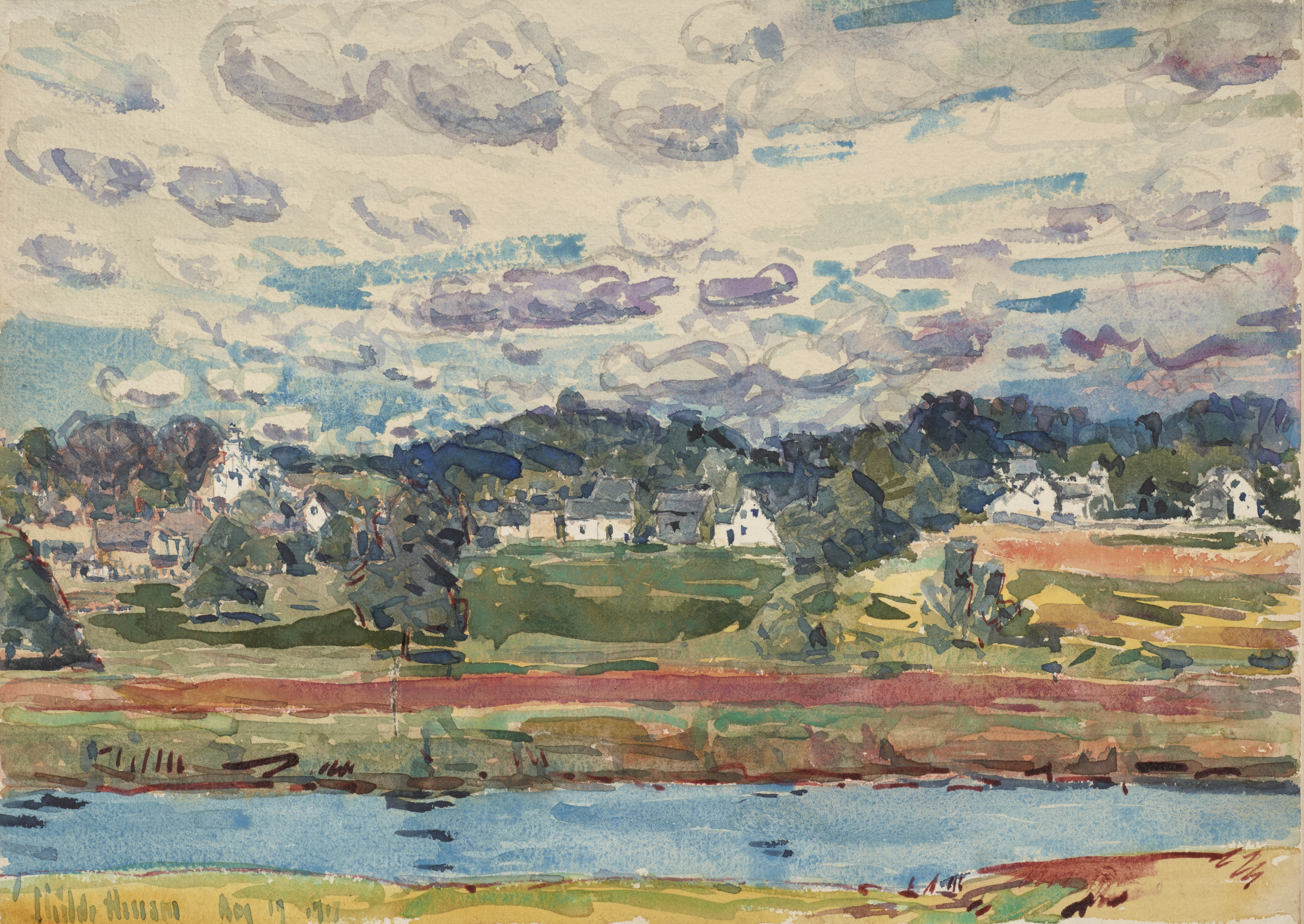
Childe Hassam, Newfields, New Hampshire, 1917, Princeton University Art Museum

Incorporated in 1849, Newfields was part of Exeter until 1727, when it became part of Newmarket. Settled in 1638, it was called "Newfield Village" as early as 1681, and later "South Newmarket", a parish of that town.

The name "Newfields" was not used by census takers until 1900. Previously, it was listed as "South New Market" (1850), "South Newmarket" (1860 and 1880), or simply as "Newmarket" (1870).

Garrison houses, built as protection against Indian attack, were not uncommon. Among the earliest tithingmen in the village were Jonathan Robinson (1678), Abraham and Jeremiah Folsom (1720), Andrew Glidden (1721), Trueworthy Leavitt (1725), Samuel Edgerly (1728), Nathaniel Gilman (1729) and Nathaniel Webster (1729).

In 1775, a bridge was built across the Squamscott River connecting the community with Stratham. This shortened the journey to Exeter, established that year as the Revolutionary capital. But the new route bypassed the center of town, built on either side of an ancient Squamscot Indian trail. This preserved old Newfields.

Wesleyan Academy was established here in 1817, a Methodist school of five boys and five girls under the tutelage of Reverend John Brodhead and others. Coeducation was then rather an advanced concept. Unfortunately, the academy struggled financially from the start because of, as administrators would conclude, "...its location in a setting of relatively few Methodists, of limited means..." And so, in 1825, it moved to Wilbraham, Massachusetts. The academy's site is now occupied by the Newfields Elementary School, with about 170 children as of 2011, from grades K–5.

In 1841, the Boston and Maine Railroad extended service to the community. In 1880, Dr. John M. Brodhead presented his own library and $10,000 to the town on condition that it be renamed "Newfields". The town was so incorporated in 1895.

== Gallery ==
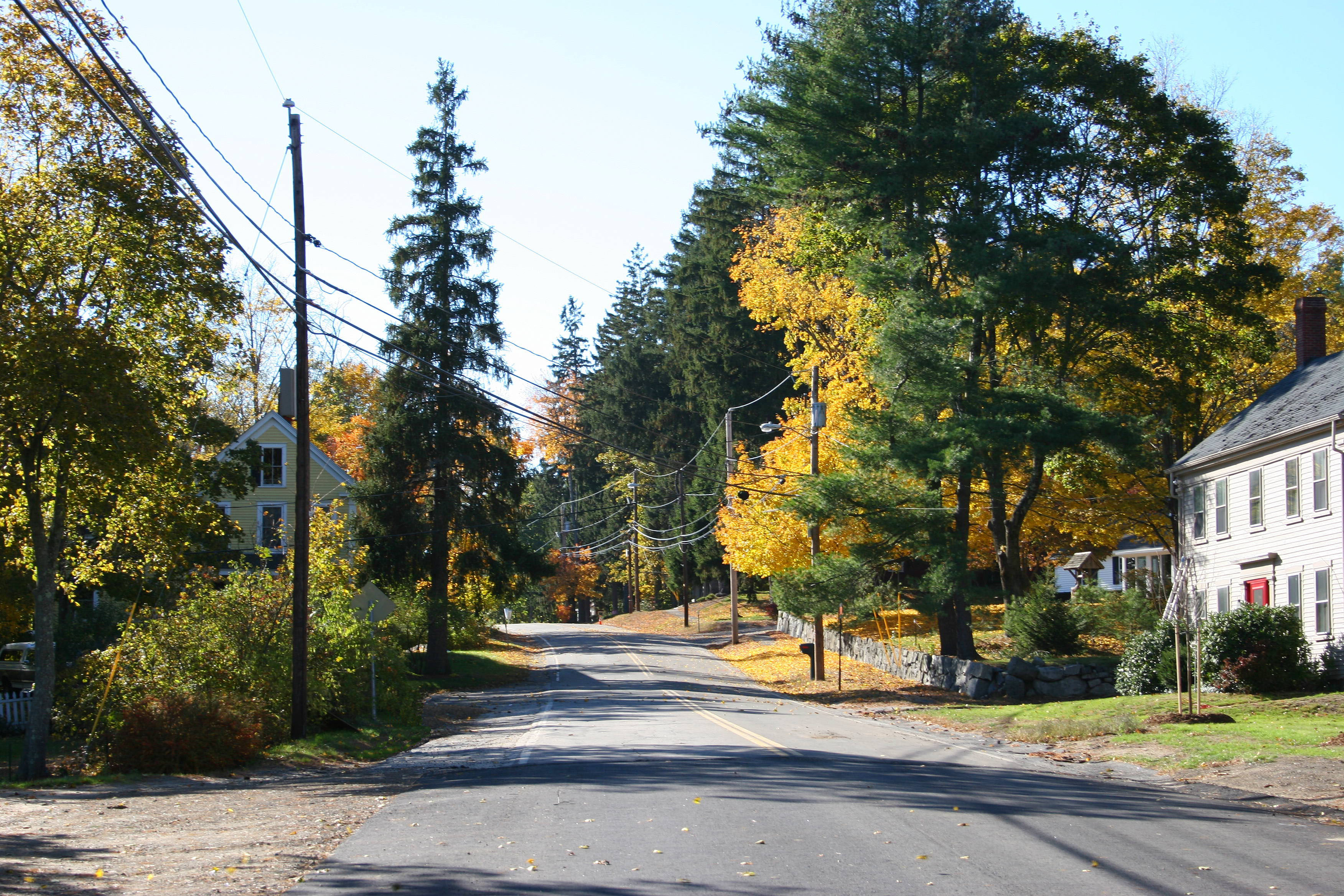
Main Street

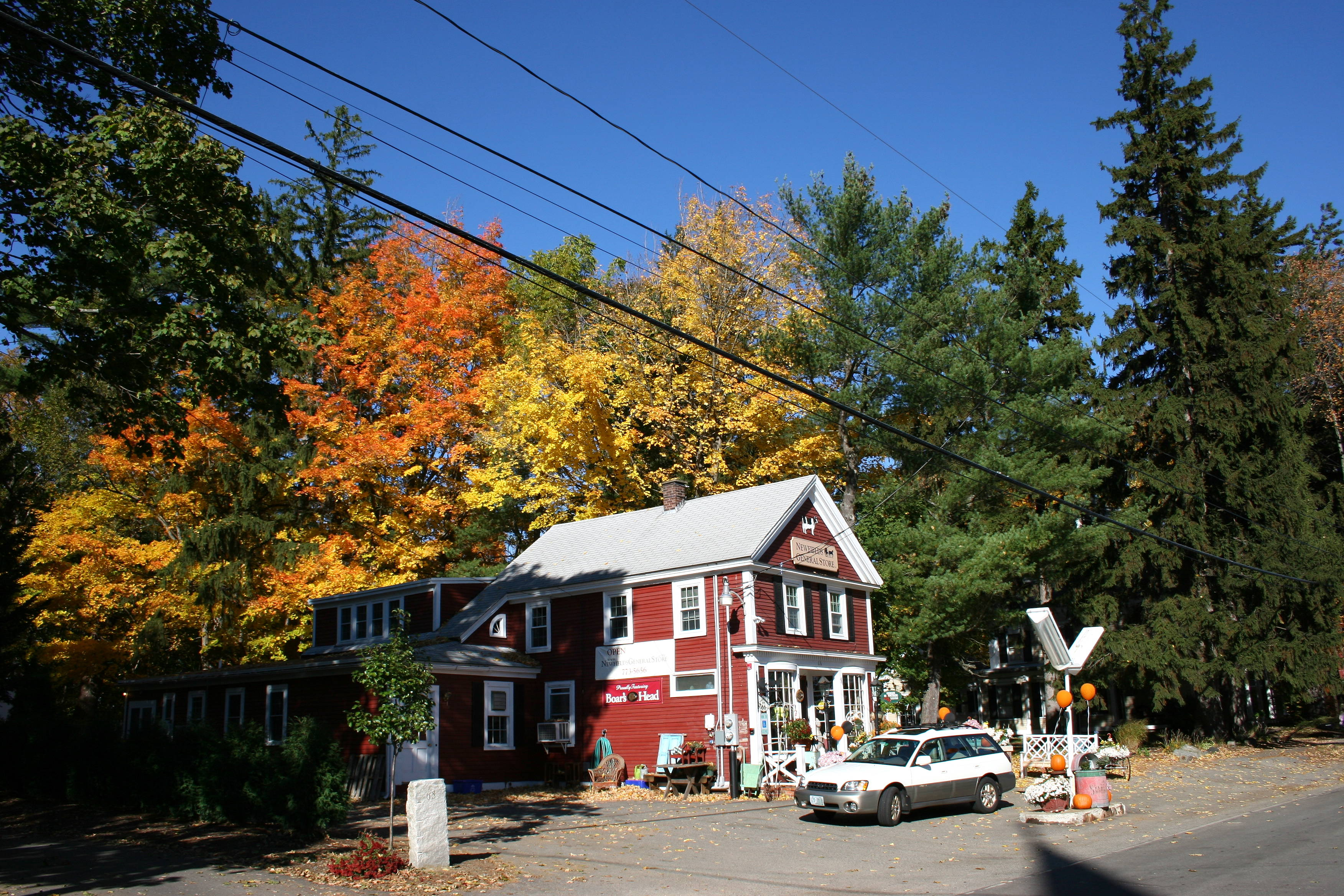
Newfields Country Store

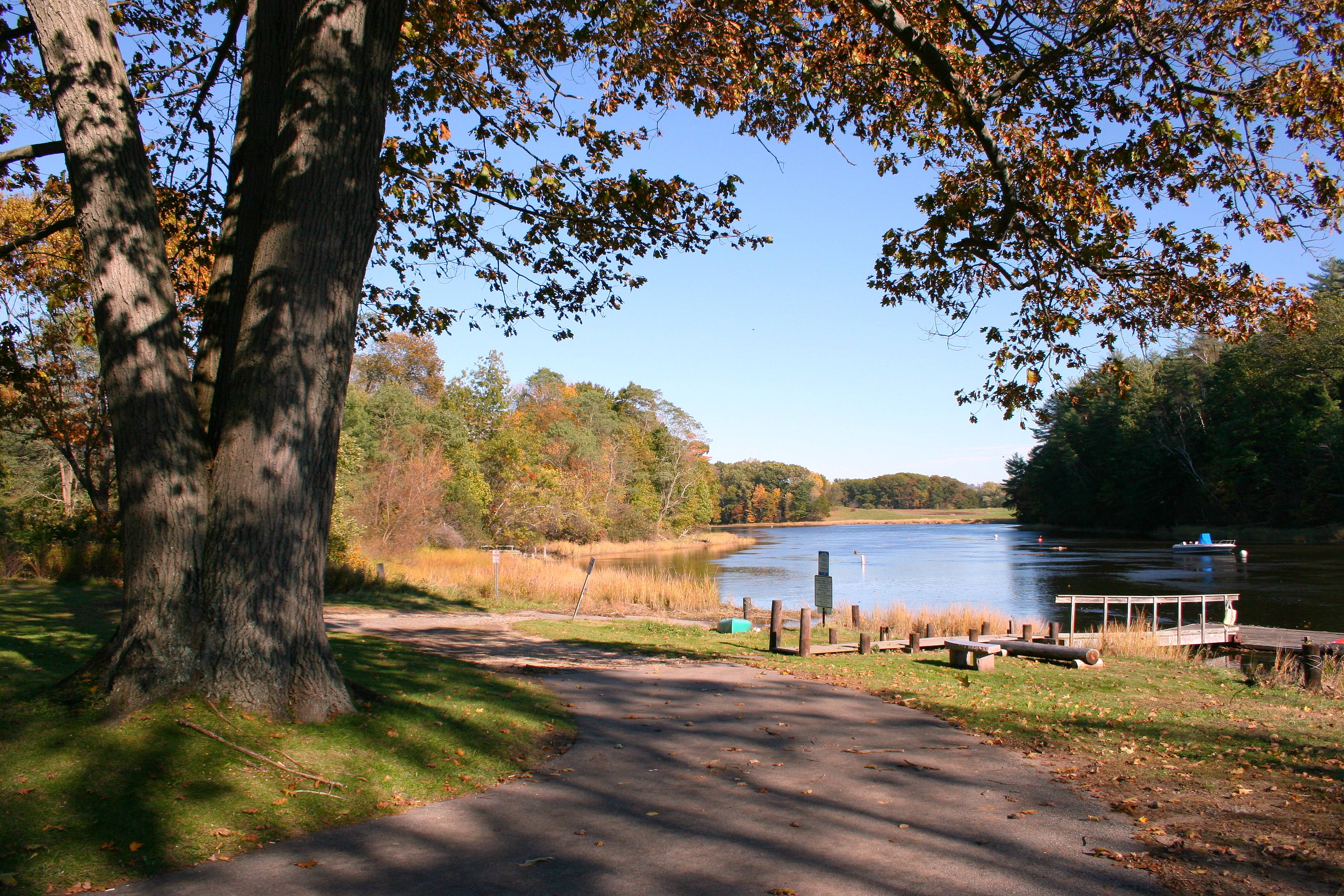
Town landing

== Geography ==
According to the United States Census Bureau, the town has a total area of 7.3 square miles (18.8 km^{2}), of which 7.1 square miles (18.4 km^{2}) are land and 0.2 square miles (0.4 km^{2}) are water, comprising 2.31% of the town. It is drained in the west by the Piscassic River, a tributary of the Lamprey River, and bounded to the east by the Squamscott River. The entire town is part of the Great Bay/Piscataqua River watershed. The highest point in Newfields is the summit of Oakland Hill at 240 feet (73 m) above sea level, on the town's southern border.

The town is crossed by New Hampshire Route 85, New Hampshire Route 87 and New Hampshire Route 108.

=== Adjacent municipalities ===
- Newmarket (north)
- Stratham (east)
- Exeter (south)
- Epping (west)

== Demographics ==
Historical population
Census	Pop.	Note	%±
1850	516		—
1860	786		52.3%
1870	808		2.8%
1880	829		2.6%
1890	855		3.1%
1900	647		−24.3%
1910	503		−22.3%
1920	470		−6.6%
1930	376		−20.0%
1940	417		10.9%
1950	469		12.5%
1960	737		57.1%
1970	843		14.4%
1980	817		−3.1%
1990	888		8.7%
2000	1,551		74.7%
2010	1,680		8.3%
2020	1,769		5.3%
U.S. Decennial Census

As of the census of 2010, there were 1,680 people, 575 households, and 487 families residing in the town. There were 591 housing units, of which 16, or 2.7%, were vacant. The racial makeup of the town was 97.5% white, 0.4% African American, 0.1% Native American, 1.0% Asian, 0.0% Native Hawaiian or Pacific Islander, 0.4% some other race, and 0.6% from two or more races. 1.3% of the population were Hispanic or Latino of any race.

Of the 575 households, 44.5% had children under the age of 18 living with them, 76.3% were headed by married couples living together, 5.7% had a female householder with no husband present, and 15.3% were non-families. 10.6% of all households were made up of individuals, and 4.2% were someone living alone who was 65 years of age or older. The average household size was 2.92, and the average family size was 3.19.

In the town, 28.6% of the population were under the age of 18, 5.4% were from 18 to 24, 20.5% from 25 to 44, 36.6% from 45 to 64, and 9.1% were 65 years of age or older. The median age was 43.1 years. For every 100 females, there were 103.4 males. For every 100 females age 18 and over, there were 99.5 males.

For the period 2011–2015, the estimated median annual income for a household was $118,333, and the median income for a family was $129,766. The per capita income for the town was $52,945. 1.7% of the population and 1.1% of families were below the poverty line. 1.1% of the population under the age of 18 and 8.0% of those 65 or older were living in poverty.

== Notable people ==
- William Badger (1752–1830), master shipbuilder
- John Brodhead (1770–1838), U.S. congressman
- Maggie Hassan (born 1958), U.S. senator; former governor of New Hampshire and state senator
- Winthrop Hilton (1671–1710), colonial military officer
- James Pike (1818–1895), U.S. congressman
- Anita Shreve (1946–2018), novelist perhaps best known for The Weight of Water
- Chris Sununu (born 1974), former New Hampshire governor

== See also ==
- New Hampshire Historical Marker No. 272: Hilton Family of Newfields
