= Stratham Historical Society =

American historic building in New Hampshire

- Wiggin Memorial Library
- U.S. National Register of Historic Places
- NH State Register of Historic Places
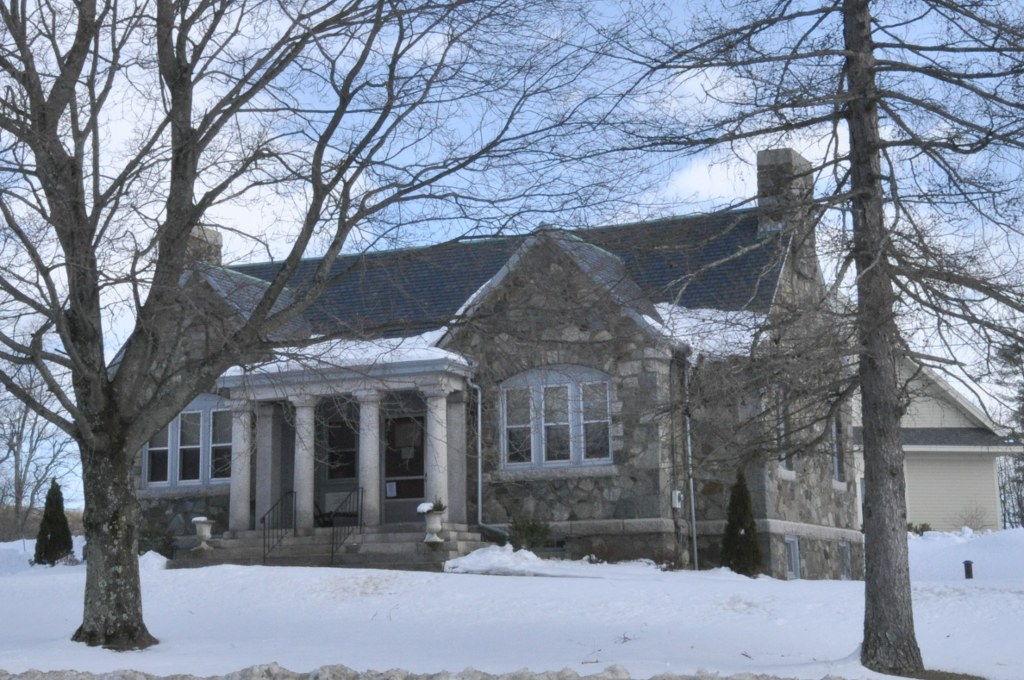
- The historical library building, now housing the Stratham Historical Society

- Location within New Hampshire Location within the United States
- Location: 158 Portsmouth Ave., Stratham, New Hampshire
- Coordinates: 43°1′30″N 70°54′42″W
- Area: less than one acre
- Built: 1912
- Built by: Sidney S. Truman
- Architect: Charles Howard Walker
- Architectural style: Late 19th and 20th Century Revivals
- NRHP reference No.: 93001381

Significant dates
- Added to NRHP: December 10, 1993
- Designated NHSRHP: April 30, 2012

The Stratham Historical Society is a local historical society serving the town of Stratham, New Hampshire. Its headquarters are at 158 Portsmouth Avenue, in the former Wiggin Memorial Library building. That building, constructed in 1912, was listed on the National Register of Historic Places in 1993, and the New Hampshire State Register of Historic Places in 2012.

== Description and history ==
The building is located at the southeast corner of Portsmouth Road and Winnicutt Road in the town center of Stratham. It is a single-story masonry structure, built out of rubblestone with granite and wooden trim. It is covered by a side gable roof, with chimneys rising from the end walls. The main facade consists of a pair of projecting gabled sections flanking a central entrance portico. The portico is supported by four large granite columns, which support a corniced entablature. The interior is organized with the librarian's desk at the center, and reading rooms in the flanking wings, with fireplaces at the end walls. Its dominant architectural features are the roof supports, which are formed out of massive curved timbers.

Stratham had private libraries beginning in 1793, and financially began to support the last of these in 1896. In 1912, a dedicated library building was built at 158 Portsmouth Avenue, to a design by Charles Howard Walker. Its construction was funded by a bequest from Emma Blodgett Wiggin, and was named as a memorial to her and her husband, George Wiggin. It served as the town's public library until 1989, when the library moved to its current facilities, the contemporary Wiggin Memorial Library. The 1912 building now serves as a research library and meeting place for the Stratham Historical Society.

== See also ==
- National Register of Historic Places listings in Rockingham County, New Hampshire
