= USS Washington (1814) =

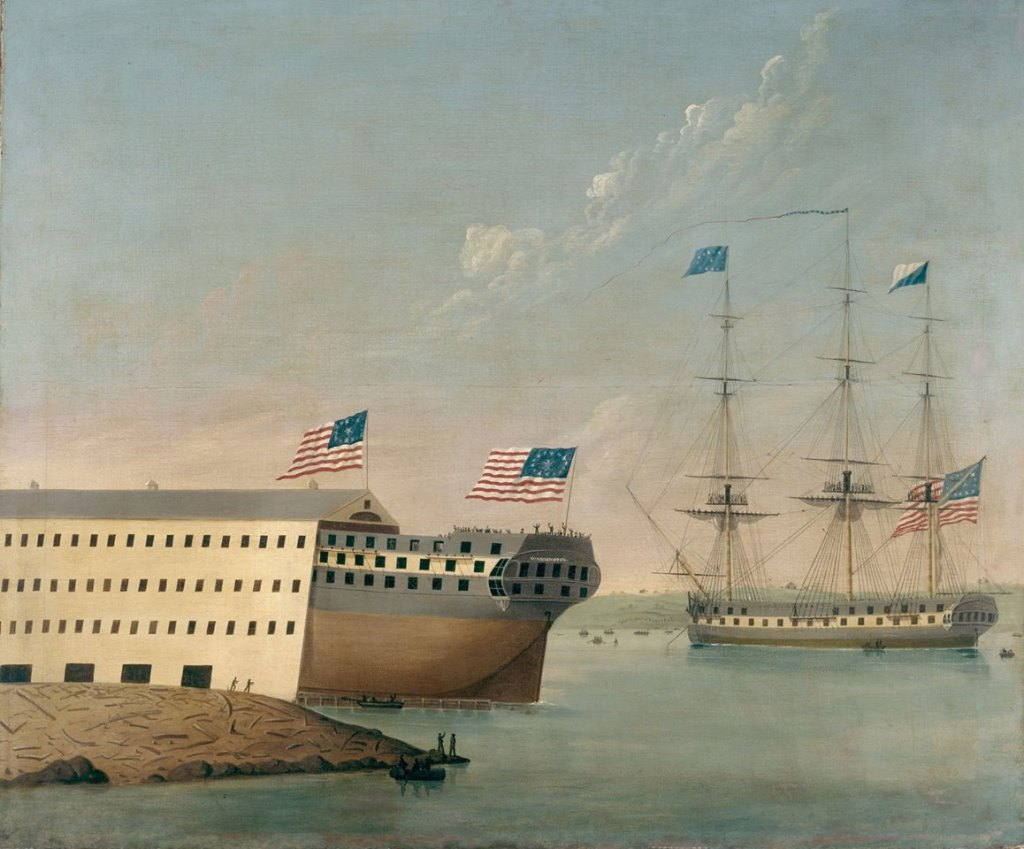
- Portsmouth Naval Shipyard launching its first new construction, the 74-gun USS Washington

History

United States
- Name: USS Washington
- Builder: Portsmouth Navy Yard
- Laid down: May 1813
- Launched: 1 October 1814
- Commissioned: 26 August 1815
- Decommissioned: 1820
- Fate: Broken up, 1843

General characteristics
- Type: Ship of the line
- Length: 190 ft 10 in (58.17 m) p/p
- Beam: 54 ft 7.5 in (16.650 m)
- Draft: 24 ft 4 in (7.42 m)
- Depth of hold: 19 ft 9 in (6.02 m)
- Complement: 750
- Armament: 90 guns

USS Washington was a ship of the line of the United States Navy. The ship, named for Founding Father and first president of the United States, George Washington, was authorized by the United States Congress on 2 January 1813 and was laid down in May of that year at the Portsmouth Navy Yard under a contract with the shipbuilders, Hart and Badger. The ship was launched on 1 October 1814 and was commissioned at Portsmouth on 26 August 1815, Captain John Orde Creighton in command.

== Service history ==
After fitting out, Washington sailed for Boston on 3 December 1815. In the spring of the following year, the ship-of-the-line shifted to Annapolis, Maryland, and arrived there on 15 May 1816. Over the ensuing days, the man-of-war welcomed a number of distinguished visitors who came on board to inspect what was, in those days, one of the more powerful American ships afloat. The guests included Commodore John Rodgers and Capt. David Porter, Col. Franklin Wharton, the Commandant of the Marine Corps, and President and Mrs. James Madison. The Chief Executive and his lady came on board "at half past meridian, to visit the ship, on which occasion yards were manned and they were saluted with 19 guns and three cheers."

Washington then sailed down Chesapeake Bay and embarked William Pinkney and his suite on 5 June. On 8 June, the ship of the line set sail for the Mediterranean flying the broad pennant of Commodore Isaac Chauncey, the commander of the Navy's fledgling Mediterranean Squadron. Washington reached Gibraltar on 2 July, en route to her ultimate destination, Naples.

Washington made port at Naples on 25 July, and Pickney debarked to commence his special mission—to adjust the claims of American merchants against the Neapolitan authorities. The talks ensued well into August. At the end of the month, the demands of diplomacy apparently satisfied, Washington set sail.

For the next two years, the ship-of-the-line operated in the Mediterranean as flagship of the American squadron, providing a display of force to encourage the Barbary states to respect American commerce. Dignitaries that visited the American man-of-war during this Mediterranean cruise included General Nugent, the commander in chief of Austrian forces (on 5 August 1817) and Prince Henry of Prussia (1781–1846) (on 12 August 1817).

On 1 February 1818, Commodore Charles Stewart relieved Commodore Chauncey as commander of the American Mediterranean Squadron, at Syracuse harbor, after which time Washington cruised to Messina and the Barbary Coast. She set sail for home on 23 May 1818—convoying 40 American merchantmen—and reached New York on 6 July 1818. The next day, the Vice President of the United States, Daniel D. Tompkins, visited the ship; and the warship blocked her colors at half-mast on the 8th, in honor of the interment of the remains of General Richard Montgomery, who had been killed leading the Continental assault against Quebec in 1775.

Following her return to the United States, Washington was commanded by Captain Arthur Sinclair until 1819.

Washington did little cruising thereafter, remaining at New York as Commodore Chauncey's flagship until 1820. Placed "in ordinary" that year, the ship-of-the-line remained inactive until broken up in 1843.

(The dimensions of the ship are uncertain, since no plan has survived, and there is evidence that the shipbuilder's plan was never sent to the Navy.)
