= William Badger (shipbuilder) =

US historical shipbuiilder

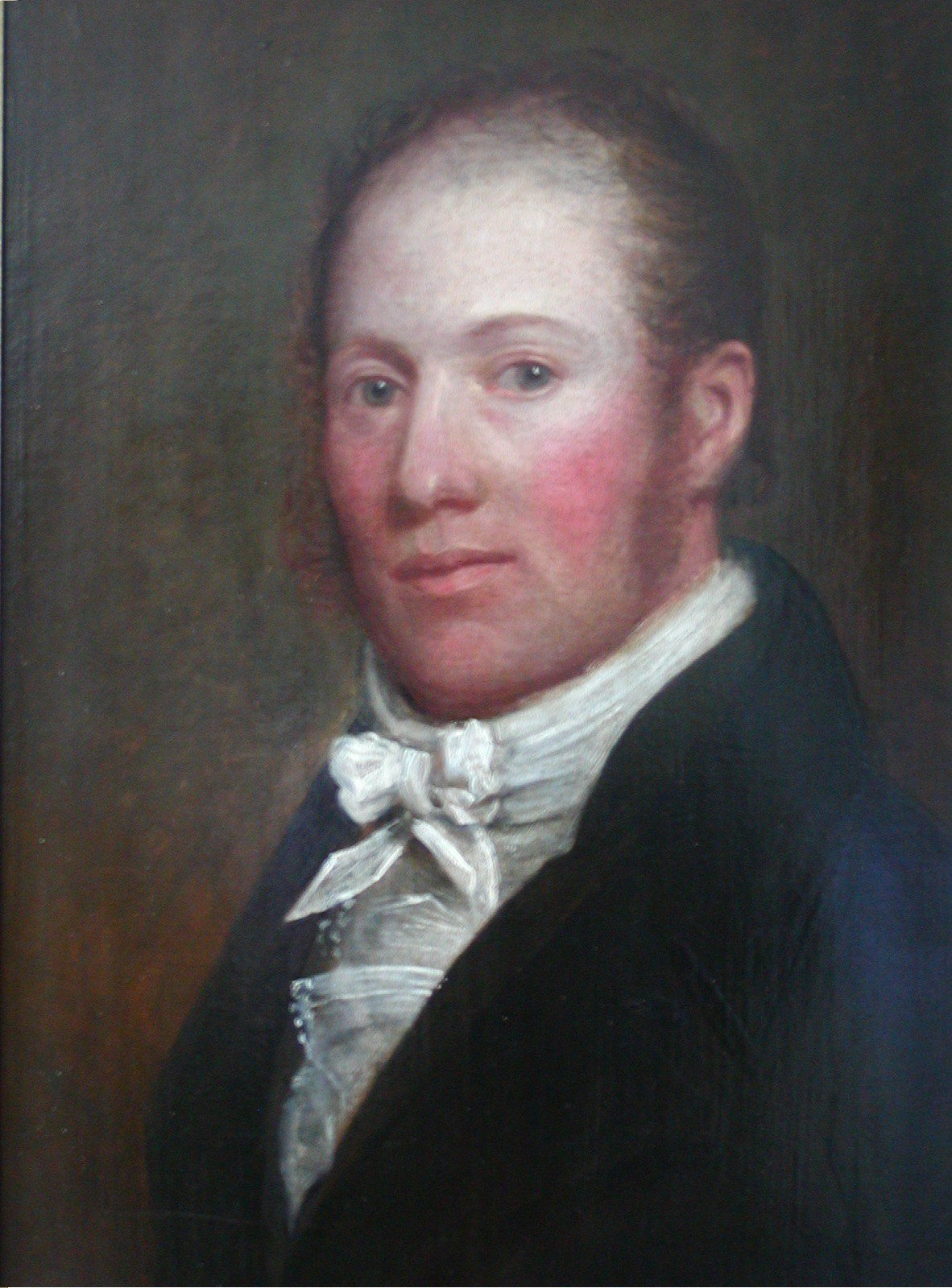
- c. 1805 portrait by James Frothingham
- Born: May 26, 1752; Newfields, New Hampshire
- Died: February 22, 1830; Kittery, Maine
- Occupation: Shipbuilder
- Known for: USS Washington
- Spouses: Abigail Goodwin Beal; Elizabeth Rice; Mary Rice Fernald

William Badger (May 26, 1752 – February 22, 1830) was a master shipbuilder operating in Kittery, Maine, United States who was rumored to have built 100 vessels.

== Life and career ==
The eldest of six children, he was born to William Badger and Anstisa Emerson Badger at what is now Newfields, New Hampshire. Trained by master shipbuilder Colonel James K. Hackett at John Langdon's shipyard on Rising Castle Island (or Langdon's Island) in Kittery, he helped build the USS Ranger. In 1782, he worked with Hackett to complete the USS America. About 1788, Badger established a shipbuilding business with David Colcord and Stilmon Tarleton on the Squamscott River at Newfields, but returned to work with Hackett from 1794 until 1799 as a master carpenter on the USS Crescent and USS Congress.

In 1797, Badger acquired 3 acres (1.3 hectares) on Rising Castle Island from his wife's family. He built a house and began shipbuilding on what would thereafter be called Badger's Island. In 1800, Commodore Isaac Hull, commander of the new Portsmouth Naval Shipyard down the Piscataqua River on Fernald's Island, contracted William Badger and his nephew Samuel Badger to build a 74-gun ship of the line. Dissatisfied with the latter shipwright, however, Hull fired both Badgers in November. A dozen years then passed at the federal shipyard without the completion of a single vessel. Hull rehired William Badger in 1813, and the USS Washington, first ship produced at the Portsmouth Naval Shipyard, launched in 1814.

Meanwhile, upriver at his own shipyard, Badger was constructing approximately two ships a year, including naval vessels, merchant vessels and privateers, while also repairing others. He entered shipping, owning the brig Fanny between 1816 and 1822, and half-owning at least 17 other vessels, most of which he had built. Between 1801 and 1850, shipbuilding was the principal industry in the Piscataqua region, where shipbuilders altogether made about 9 vessels per year, each averaging 200 tons. But William Badger, generally called Master Badger, achieved the greatest renown. He died in 1830 after a long illness, and was buried on the island which bears his name. The USS William Badger, a whaling ship acquired by the U.S. Navy during the Civil War, was named after him, an honor reserved for his last vessel built in 1828.

== See also ==
- The Portsmouth Athenæum, which preserves the portrait, papers and half models of William Badger
