= Charles Howard Walker =

American architect, designer and educator

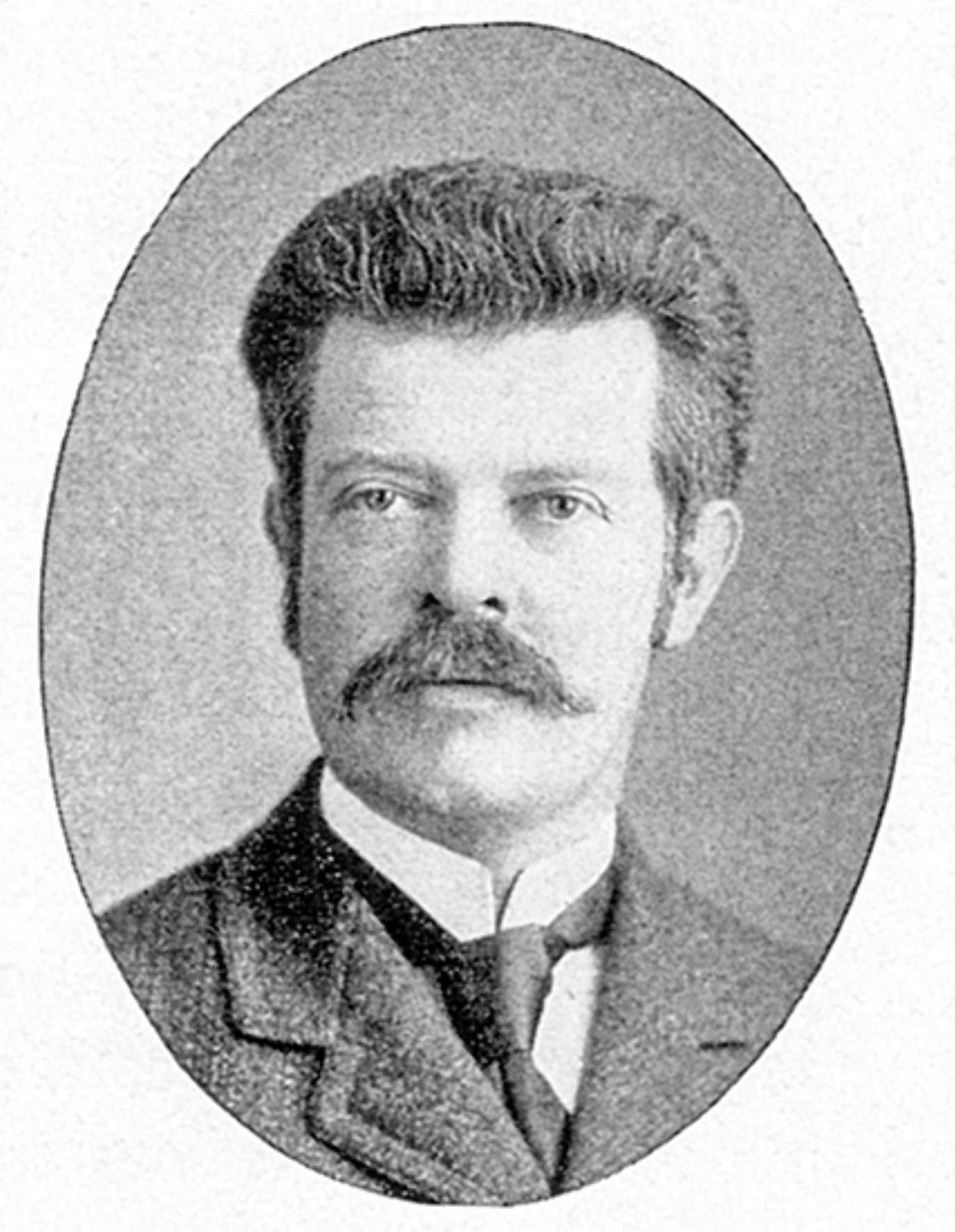
- Charles Howard Walker (c. 1898)
- Born: January 9, 1857; West Roxbury, Massachusetts
- Died: April 12, 1936 (aged 79); West Roxbury, Massachusetts
- Occupation: Architect

Charles Howard Walker F.A.I.A. (January 9, 1857 – April 12, 1936) was an architect, designer and educator in Boston, Massachusetts, in the late 19th and early 20th centuries. He was associated with the architecture department at the Massachusetts Institute of Technology and was affiliated with Boston's Society of Arts and Crafts.

== Biography ==
Walker was born January 9, 1857, in West Roxbury, Massachusetts, to George S. Walker and Mary L. Damorell. In 1875 at the age of 18, Walker worked at the architectural office of Sturgis and Brigham, where he had opportunities to study architecture in New York, Europe, and Asia Minor.

In 1885, Walker partnered with Thomas Rogers Kimball and formed the firm Walker & Kimball. This partnership continued until 1899 when it ended after Walker and Kimball were architects in chief for the Trans-Mississippi Exposition and Greater America Exposition in Omaha, Nebraska. Walker practiced architecture solo until 1911 when he formed with his son, Harold D. Walker, the firm C. Howard Walker and Son. In 1925, architect Frederick S. Kingsbury joined the firm and was renamed to Walker and Walker and Kingsbury. Shortly after in 1930, the firm was renamed to Walker and Walker.

Walker was a lecturer at the Massachusetts Institute of Technology and was associated with their department of architecture for forty-nine years. He also lectured at the Boston Museum of Fine Arts and Lowell Institute.

Walker was a member of the Boston Art Commission, National Fine Arts Commission, American Academy of Arts and Sciences, National Institute of Arts and Letters, American Federation of Arts, and the Boston Society of Arts and Crafts. Walker was one of six delegates for the United States at the International Congress of Architects in 1930 in Budapest.

Walker died April 12, 1936, in West Roxbury, Massachusetts.

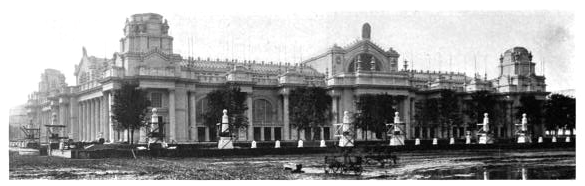
Palace of Electricity, St. Louis World's Fair, 1903; designed by Walker & Kimball

== Designed by Walker ==
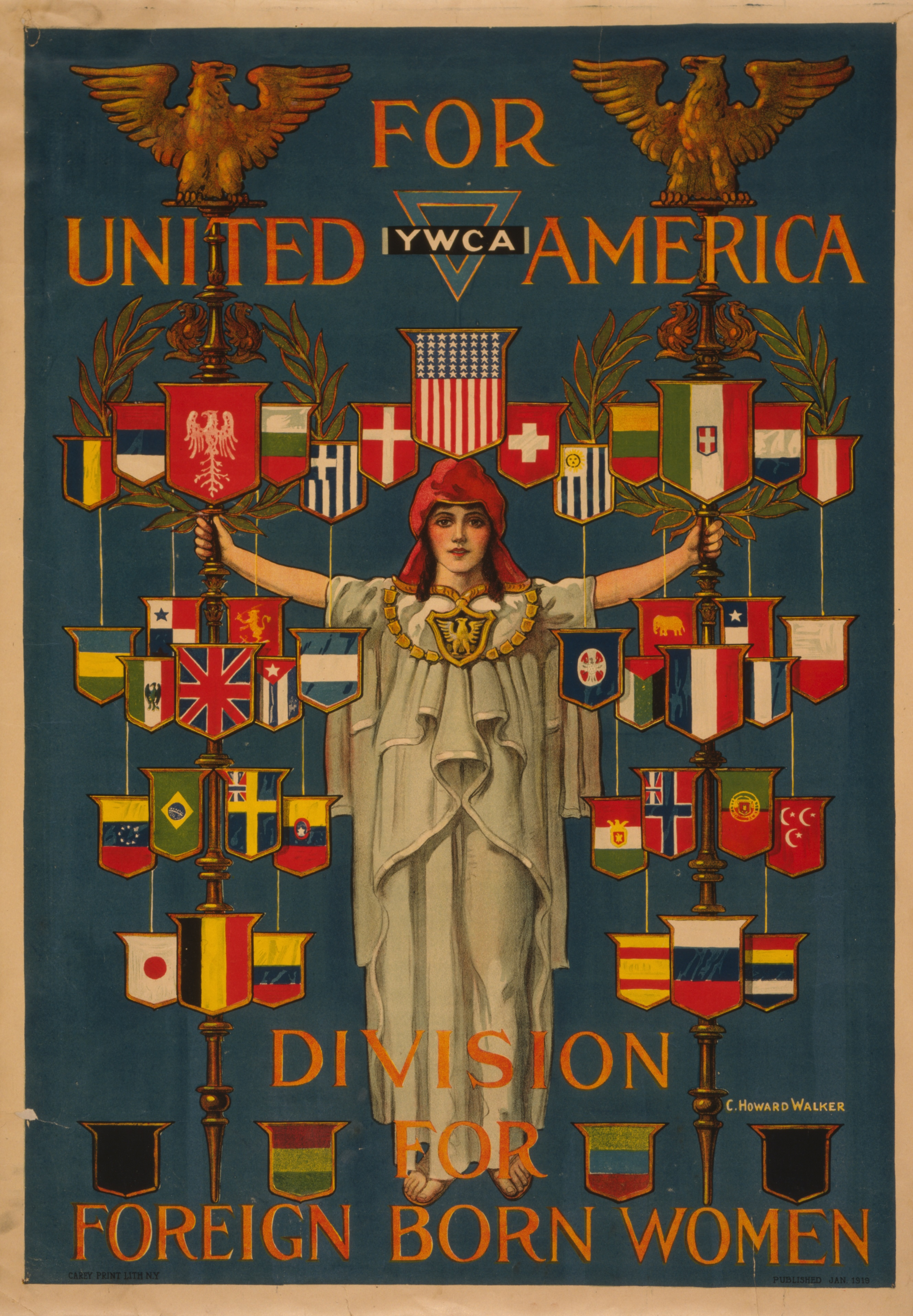
Poster "For United America, YWCA Division for Foreign Born Women," designed by C. Howard Walker, 1919

- Mount Vernon Church, Beacon St., Boston, ca.1892
- Trans-Mississippi Exposition, Omaha, Nebraska, 1898
- Bancroft Memorial Library, Hopedale, Massachusetts, ca. 1898
- Electricity building, St. Louis World's Fair, 1903
- Stony Brook Bridge, Back Bay Fens, Boston
- William Fogg Library, Eliot, Maine, 1907
- Rye Public Library, Rye, New Hampshire, 1910
- Stratham Historical Society building, Stratham, New Hampshire, 1912
  - originally the George A. and Emma B. Wiggin Memorial Library building
