= USS William Badger =

Cargo ship of the United States Navy

History

United States
- Namesake: William Badger
- Builder: William Badger
- Launched: 1828
- Acquired: 18 May 1861
- In service: 1861
- Out of service: 1865
- Fate: Sold, 17 October 1865

General characteristics
- Displacement: 334 tons
- Length: 106 ft (32 m)
- Beam: 26 ft (7.9 m)
- Depth of hold: 13 ft 3 in (4.04 m)
- Propulsion: sail
- Armament: one 32-pounder gun

USS William Badger was a whaler acquired by the Union Navy during the American Civil War. She was used by the Union Navy as a supply ship and ship’s tender in support of the Union Navy blockade of Confederate waterways.

== Service history ==
William Badger—a wooden-hulled whaling ship—was purchased by the Union Navy on 18 May 1861 from Henry F. Thomas, at New Bedford, Massachusetts. Built in 1828, it was the last vessel constructed by master shipbuilder William Badger of Badger's Island in Kittery, Maine, so it received the name reserved for that honor. Assigned to the North Atlantic Blockading Squadron, William Badger served as a stationary supply ship at Hampton Roads, Virginia, into the summer of 1862.

Late in July, William Badger—laden with a "goodly supply of provisions, clothing, and stores" for the ships of the Union Navy maintaining the blockade off Confederate-held Wilmington, North Carolina—was towed by the steamer USS State of Georgia to the North Atlantic Blockading Squadron base at Beaufort, North Carolina. She remained there as a supply hulk for the remainder of the Civil War and, on occasion, served as an accommodations vessel. She was sold at auction at Beaufort on 17 October 1865 to a Capt. James Abel, William Badger may have been broken up shortly thereafter, as she is not carried on mercantile lists in succeeding years.
