= Stratham, New Hampshire =

- Town
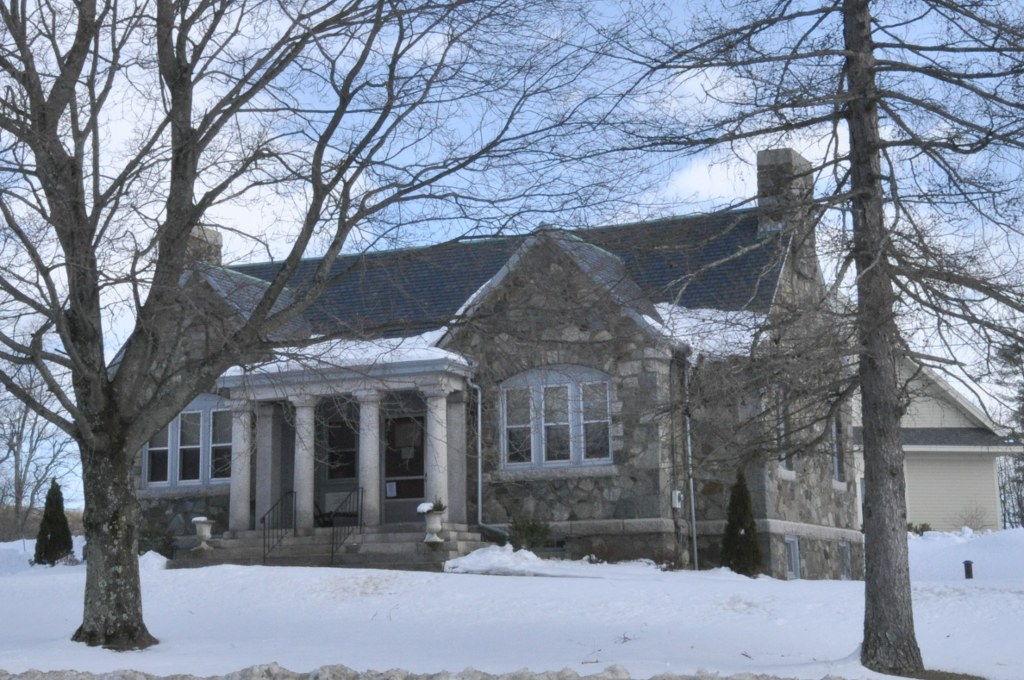
- The Stratham Historical Society, housed in the former Wiggin Memorial Library building

- Seal

- Location in Rockingham County and the state of New Hampshire.
- Coordinates: 43°01′27″N 70°54′49″W
- Country: United States
- State: New Hampshire
- County: Rockingham
- Incorporated: 1716
- Villages: Stratham; Winniconic; Winnicut Mills

Area
  - Total: 15.50 sq mi (40.15 km^{2})
  - Land: 15.15 sq mi (39.23 km^{2})
  - Water: 0.36 sq mi (0.92 km^{2}) 2.29%
- Elevation: 59 ft (18 m)

Population (2020)
  - Total: 7,669
  - Density: 506/sq mi (195.5/km^{2})
- Time zone: UTC-5 (Eastern)
  - Summer (DST): UTC-4 (Eastern)
- ZIP code: 03885
- Area code: 603
- FIPS code: 33-74340
- GNIS feature ID: 873728
- Website: www.strathamnh.gov

Stratham is a town in Rockingham County, New Hampshire, United States. The town had a population of 7,669 at the 2020 census. It is bounded on the west by the Squamscott River. The town is the home of the only U.S. Lindt & Sprüngli factory and the headquarters of the Timberland Corporation.

== History ==
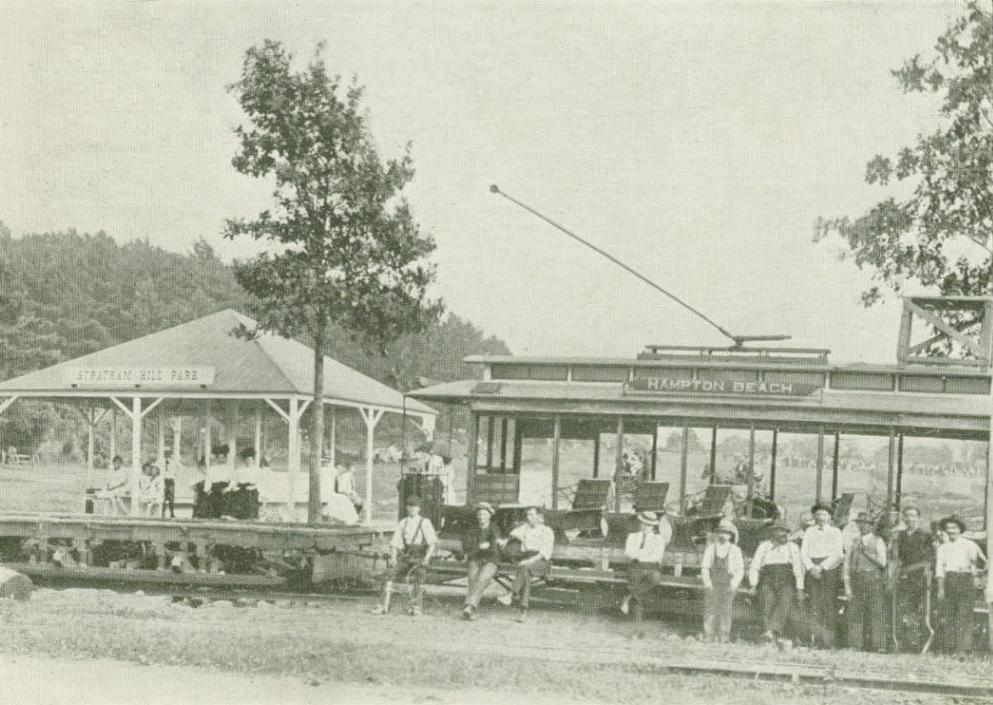
Stratham Hill Park c. 1905

Stratham was settled in 1631 and incorporated in 1716. The area, called Winnicutt by the Pennacook people, was known as "Squamscott Patent" or "Point of Rocks" because of its location between Great Bay and the Squamscott River. The sixth town in the colony to be incorporated, the town was named for Wriothesley Russell, Baron Howland of Streatham, a friend of New Hampshire Royal Governor Samuel Shute.

The town is unusual among New England settlements of its size in having been comprehensively mapped in 1793 by Phinehas Merrill. It is therefore possible to identify how many of the extant buildings of the town predate the map.

Beginning in 1967, the town hosted the annual Stratham Fair, held at Stratham Hill Park during the summer. However, the fair was canceled in 2020, due to the COVID-19 pandemic, and has not been held since, reportedly due to net operating losses in its final year, along with outdated equipment and infrastructure. Since 2023, the town has held an annual "Summerfest" at the park. Stratham Hill Park was the site of a wood pavilion collapse during a microburst in 1991, which cause the deaths of three people and left 11 others injured.

The town has multiple properties listed on the National Register of Historic Places, including the John Crockett House, Emery Farm, and original Wiggin Memorial Library building.

== Geography ==
According to the United States Census Bureau, the town has a total area of 15.5 square miles (40.2 km^{2}), of which 15.1 square miles (39.2 km^{2}) are land and 0.3 square miles (0.9 km^{2}) are water, comprising 2.29% of the town. Most of Stratham is drained by the Squamscott River, a north-flowing tributary of Great Bay. The east side of the town drains to the Winnicut River, which also flows to Great Bay. The entire town is part of the Piscataqua River watershed. The highest elevation in town is 290 feet (88 m) above sea level, found on the summits of Stratham Hill and neighboring Jewell Hill, both glacial drumlins.

Stratham Hill Park and nearby Gordon Barker Town Forest offer a combined trail system for hikers and mountain bikers.

Stratham is crossed by New Hampshire Routes 33, 108 and 111. Additionally, the New Hampshire Route 101 expressway passes through the southern portion of town.

=== Adjacent municipalities ===
- Greenland (northeast)
- North Hampton (southeast)
- Exeter (southwest)
- Newfields (west)
- Newmarket (northwest)

== Demographics ==
Historical population
Census	Pop.	Note	%±
1790	882		—
1800	890		0.9%
1810	874		−1.8%
1820	892		2.1%
1830	838		−6.1%
1840	875		4.4%
1850	840		−4.0%
1860	859		2.3%
1870	769		−10.5%
1880	720		−6.4%
1890	680		−5.6%
1900	718		5.6%
1910	602		−16.2%
1920	542		−10.0%
1930	552		1.8%
1940	634		14.9%
1950	759		19.7%
1960	1,033		36.1%
1970	1,512		46.4%
1980	2,507		65.8%
1990	4,955		97.6%
2000	6,355		28.3%
2010	7,255		14.2%
2020	7,669		5.7%
U.S. Decennial Census

As of the 2020 census, the population of Stratham was 7,669 people and 2,886 households. The 2010 census showed 2,045 families residing in the town. The population density was 507.8 inhabitants per square mile (196.1/km^{2}). As of 2010, there were 2,864 housing units at an average density of 189.7 per square mile (73.2/km^{2}). The racial makeup of the town as of 2020 was 91.4% White, 0.2% African American, 3.1% Asian, 0.6% some other race, and 4.7% from two or more races. Hispanic or Latino of any race were 2.2% of the population. Native Hawaiian or Pacific Islander, and Native American represented 0% of the population, accord to the 2020 census data.

The 2010 census showed that there were 2,746 households in Stratham, out of which 37.7% had children under the age of 18 living with them, 64.0% were headed by married couples living together, 7.6% had a female householder with no husband present, and 25.5% were non-families. 20.4% of all households were made up of individuals, and 6.6% were someone living alone who was 65 years of age or older. The average household size was 2.64, and the average family size was 3.08.

In the town, the population was spread out, with 26.4% under the age of 18, 5.0% from 18 to 24, 22.2% from 25 to 44, 34.9% from 45 to 64, and 11.6% who were 65 years of age or older. The median age was 43.3 years. For every 100 females, there were 95.0 males. For every 100 females age 18 and over, there were 91.4 males.

For the period 2016–2020, the estimated median annual income for a household in the town was $126,009. Male full-time workers had a median income of $102,315 versus $56,750 for females. As of 2020, the per capita income for the town was $62,776, while 2.4% of the population were below the poverty line.

== Public safety ==
Stratham has an all-volunteer fire department located in a new building at the intersection of Winnicut Road and Portsmouth Avenue (NH 33) next to the Stratham Historical Society.

The Stratham Police Department is located at 76 Portsmouth Avenue. The department has 12 full-time officers, one part-time officer, one prosecutor and one full-time administrative assistant. According to their website, the "Stratham Police are very community oriented and are involved in several events such as National Night Out, Coffee With a Cop, Bike Rodeos, Family Fun Day, and many others."

== Education ==
Stratham is home to two schools: the Cooperative Middle School and Stratham Memorial School. Stratham Memorial School, the public elementary school, is located at 39 Gifford Farm Road and teaches from Pre-K to 5th grade. The Cooperative Middle School (CMS) is located at 100 Academic Way and includes grades 6–8. High school students from Stratham (grades 9–12) attend Exeter High School. Stratham Memorial School only serve students from Stratham, while the high school and middle school serve students from all six towns of SAU 16—in which Stratham is the second-largest town, after Exeter.

Stratham was the location of a campus of New Hampshire Technical College starting in the 1980s. The college was later merged into Great Bay Community College, whose campus is in Portsmouth. The Stratham campus was closed and sold.

== Notable people ==
- David Barker Jr. (1797–1834), US congressman
- Josiah Bartlett Jr. (1768–1838), physician, US congressman
- Daniel Clark (1809–1891), US senator
- Eric Flaim (b. 1967), Olympic silver-medalist speed skater
- Maurice J. Murphy Jr. (1927–2002), US senator
- Scott Poteet (b. 1973), crew member of SpaceX's Polaris Dawn mission
- William W. Treat (1918–2010), judge, banker, and New Hampshire Republican Party chairman
- Thomas Wiggin (1601–1666), first governor of the Upper Plantation of New Hampshire
- Paine Wingate (1739–1838), served in the Continental Congress
