= Squamscott River =

Tidal river in New Hampshire, United States

- Squamscott River in fall 2005 at Route 108, Newfields, NH

- Location within New Hampshire Location within the United States

Location
- Country: United States
- State: New Hampshire
- County: Rockingham
- Towns: Exeter, Stratham, Newfields, Newmarket

Physical characteristics
- Source: Exeter River
  - location: Exeter
  - coordinates: 42°58′55″N 70°56′45″W
  - elevation: 0 ft (0 m)
- Mouth: Great Bay
  - location: Newmarket
  - coordinates: 43°3′49″N 70°54′11″W
  - elevation: 0 ft (0 m)
- Length: 6 mi (10 km)

Basin features
- Tributaries
  - left: Norris Brook, Rocky Hill Brook, Parting Brook
  - right: Wheelwright Creek, Mill Brook, Jewell Hill Brook

The Squamscott River is a 6-mile-long (10 km) tidal river in southeastern New Hampshire, in the United States, fed by the Exeter River. The first 33 miles (53 km) of freshwater river from Chester to downtown Exeter is known as the Exeter River, and the subsequent 9 miles (14 km) of saltwater from downtown Exeter to the Great Bay tidal estuary is known as the Squamscott River.

The combined Exeter-Squamscott watershed is 81,726 acres (127.697 sq mi) and contains 68,245 people. It includes portions of Chester, Raymond, Fremont, Danville, Kingston, East Kingston, Sandown, Kensington, Brentwood, Exeter, Newfields, and Stratham.

== Etymology ==
The Squamscott, also spelled Swampscott and Swamscott, gets its name from the Squamscott Indians, who called it Msquam-s-kook (or Msquamskek), translated as "at the salmon place" or "big water place". Plentiful game, the marshes and lush river-fed vegetation, and an abundance of fish supported the northeast Native American people who were present in the region for thousands of years until English settlers displaced them in the early 17th century. The Native American tribes of New Hampshire were most likely from the Abenaki nation, and independent of the Maine-based tribes. The name "Abenaki" and its derivatives originated from an Algonquin word meaning "people of the dawn" or "easterners". In the eastern part of New Hampshire were the Pequaquaukes (or Pequakets), the Ossipees, the Minnecometts, the Piscataquas and the Squamscotts (Msquamskek).

== Geography ==
=== Exeter River ===
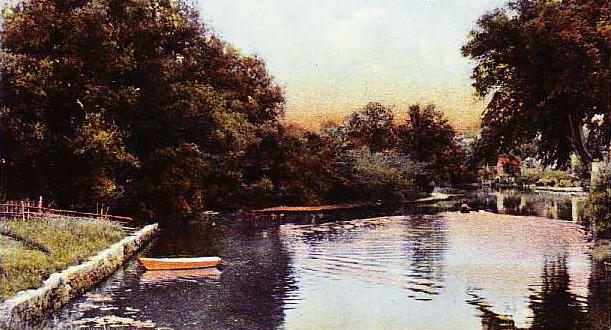
The Exeter River in Exeter, NH (1907)

The Exeter River originates from a group of freshwater spring-fed ponds in Chester, New Hampshire, and ends at the site of the former Great Dam of downtown Exeter. The river moves through wetlands in Fremont and Danville, some rapids in Brentwood, and through forest at Phillips Exeter Academy before ending at the dam. The dam in Exeter was removed in the summer of 2016, restoring the river's natural flow into the Squamscott River.

There are falls and small dams at several locations along the river.

The Exeter River drainage basin encompasses an area of 126 square miles (330 km^{2}). The upper 33.3 miles (53.6 km) of the river, from its headwaters to its confluence with Great Brook in Exeter, were designated into the NH Rivers Management and Protection Program in August 1995.

=== Squamscott River ===
The Squamscott begins at downtown Exeter and runs north between Newfields and Stratham to Great Bay, which is connected to the Piscataqua River, and eventually feeds into the Atlantic Ocean.

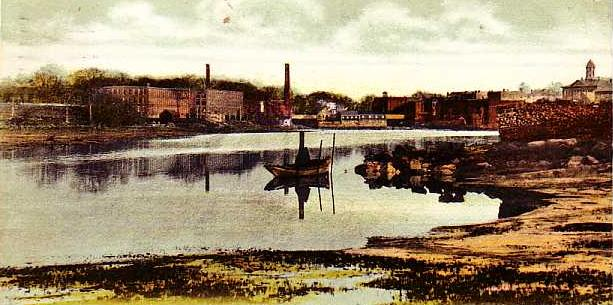
Squamscott River in 1908, Exeter, NH

After rising at the Great Bridge (a Works Progress Administration project that carries what is now New Hampshire Route 27) in downtown Exeter, the river passes the Phillips Exeter Academy boathouse, then tends north alongside the Swasey Parkway, through the haymarshes, passing by the town's water purification plant and then under Route 101, a major east–west arterial road in New Hampshire. The river next passes under Route 108 at the boundary of Newfields and Stratham. The river then debouches into Great Bay, a broad and shallow tidal estuary, just south of the mouth of the Lamprey River, arriving at the bay from Newmarket.

The Squamscott River is 9 miles (14 km) long, and transitions from freshwater to saltwater as it enters the Great Bay estuary.

== Wildlife ==
The watershed is dominated by hardwood and transitional forests, which provide habitat for moose, black bear, and birds. The river also is habitat for Blanding's turtles, New England cottontail, and the blue spotted salamander. Fish species include brook trout, small and large mouth bass, yellow perch, and chain pickerel; there is also a spawning area for alewife and blueback herring.

== Human use ==
The Phillips Exeter Academy sport rowing crew team holds its practices on the Squamscott River in Exeter.

As of 2023, there is an active sewer pipe replacement project for the sewers underneath Squamscott River. These sewers serve approximately 35% of the town including Jady Hill, Exeter Mill and sections of the commercial areas on Portsmouth Avenue, and were discovered by cleaners to be corroded from being over fifty years old. Water is being drawn into the pipe from a corrosion-caused leak, which may lead to the backup of sewage into people's homes.

== See also ==
- List of rivers of New Hampshire
