= USRC Scammel (1798) =

History

United States
- Name: Scammel or Scammel II
- Namesake: Alexander Scammell, Adjutant General of the Continental Army
- Owner: United States Revenue Marine, 1798; United States Navy, 1798–1801
- Builder: James Hackett, Badger's Island, Kittery, Maine (then a part of New Hampshire)
- Launched: 11 August 1798
- Fate: Sold 20 June 1801 at Baltimore, Maryland

General characteristics
- Type: double topsail schooner
- Displacement: 132 tons
- Length: 58 feet (keel), 75 feet (deck)
- Beam: 20 feet (mean)
- Draft: 9 feet
- Complement: 65–70 men
- Armament: 14 4–6 pounders

USRC Scammel or sometimes referred to as Scammel II was a revenue cutter built in 1798 to serve in the Quasi-War with France. After completion she was transferred to the U.S. Navy and served in the West Indies naval squadron commanded by Commodore John Barry. While in Revenue-Marine service her captain was John Adams. In a letter dated 20 May, 1799 Navy Secretary Benjamin Stoddert notified the Treasury Secretary that he should consider her to be officially transferred to the U.S. Navy. In U.S. Navy service her first captain was Lieutenant Mark Fernald. She assisted the sloop USS Portsmouth in the surrender of the French navy ship Hussar August 20-22, 1799. Arrived in New York late September, 1799. She was ordered to St. Kitts on 16 October, 1799. After the war, the Navy retained Scammel until it was sold in 1801.
