= Portsmouth Athenæum =

Historic house in New Hampshire, United States

- Portsmouth Athenaeum
- U.S. National Register of Historic Places
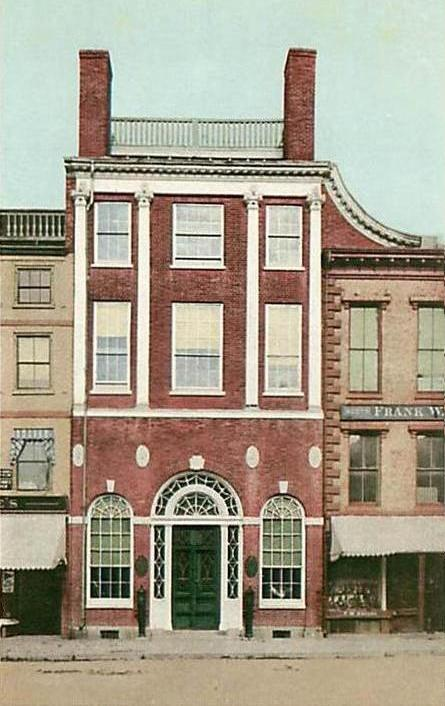
- Portsmouth Athenæum

- Location within New Hampshire Location within the United States
- Location: 9 Market Square, Portsmouth, New Hampshire
- Coordinates: 43°4′37.5″N 70°45′27″W
- Built: 1805
- Architect: Bradbury Johnson
- Architectural style: Federal
- NRHP reference No.: 73000171
- Added to NRHP: May 5, 1973

The Portsmouth Athenæum is an independent membership library, gallery, and museum in Portsmouth, New Hampshire, United States. It preserves and provides access to an extensive collection of manuscripts, rare books, photographs, artworks and artifacts, and digital collections related to local history and genealogy, in addition to a circulating library for its membership. As an intellectual center of the community, it sponsors exhibitions, concerts, lectures, and other educational and cultural programs. The building, dating to 1805, has been listed on the National Register of Historic Places since 1973.

== The Athenæum Society ==
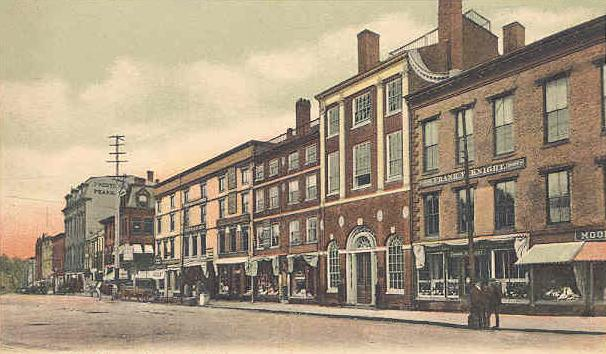
Market Square c. 1905

The Athenæum was incorporated in 1817 as the Portsmouth Athenæum Society. The institution's 1805 Federal style building, located on Market Square at the city's heart, was acquired by the society in 1823. It was designed by architect Bradbury Johnson (1766–1820) as the office for the New Hampshire Fire & Marine Insurance Company, which went bankrupt. In 1981 and 1995, the Athenæum expanded into the adjacent building at 6–8 Market Square to accommodate its Shaw Research Library and Randall Gallery.

Like most athenæums, it combines the functions of a library with those of a gallery and museum. The institution retains certain nineteenth-century customs—members are "proprietors," and the director is "keeper." Its collection includes more than 40,000 volumes, with an archive of about 12,000 photographs, 4,000 of which are posted on the Athenæum's website.

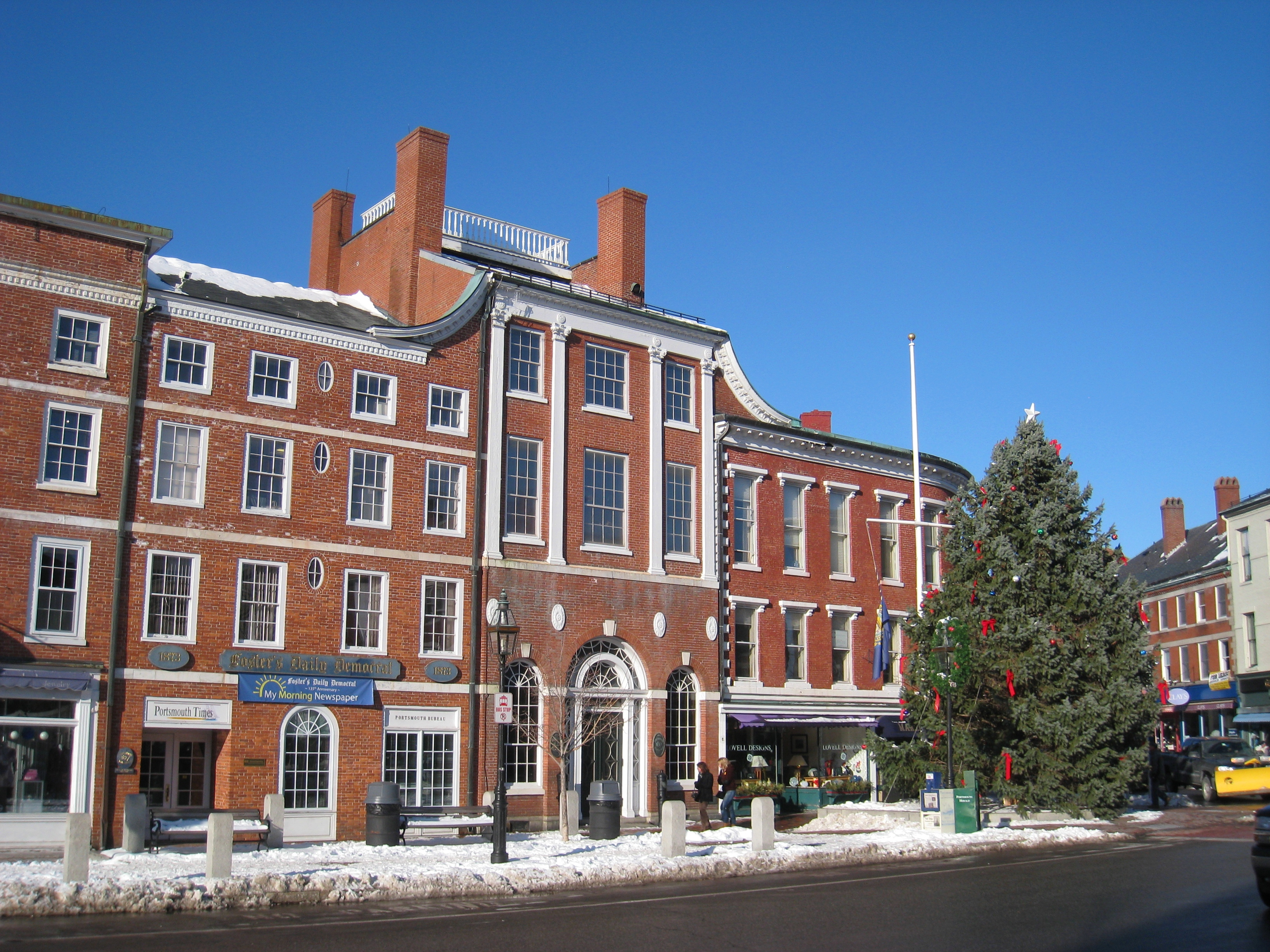
Market Square in 2009

Portsmouth was once a major New England seaport. As a consequence, the Athenæum has a strong emphasis on maritime history, particularly shipbuilding at Badger's Island and the Portsmouth Naval Shipyard, both located across the Piscataqua River in Kittery, Maine. Walls are hung with paintings of ships and the half models used to plan their construction. There are portraits of prominent figures from Portsmouth and the region, including sea captains, merchants and shipbuilders. The reading room features a full-length portrait of Sir Peter Warren.

=== Portraits ===
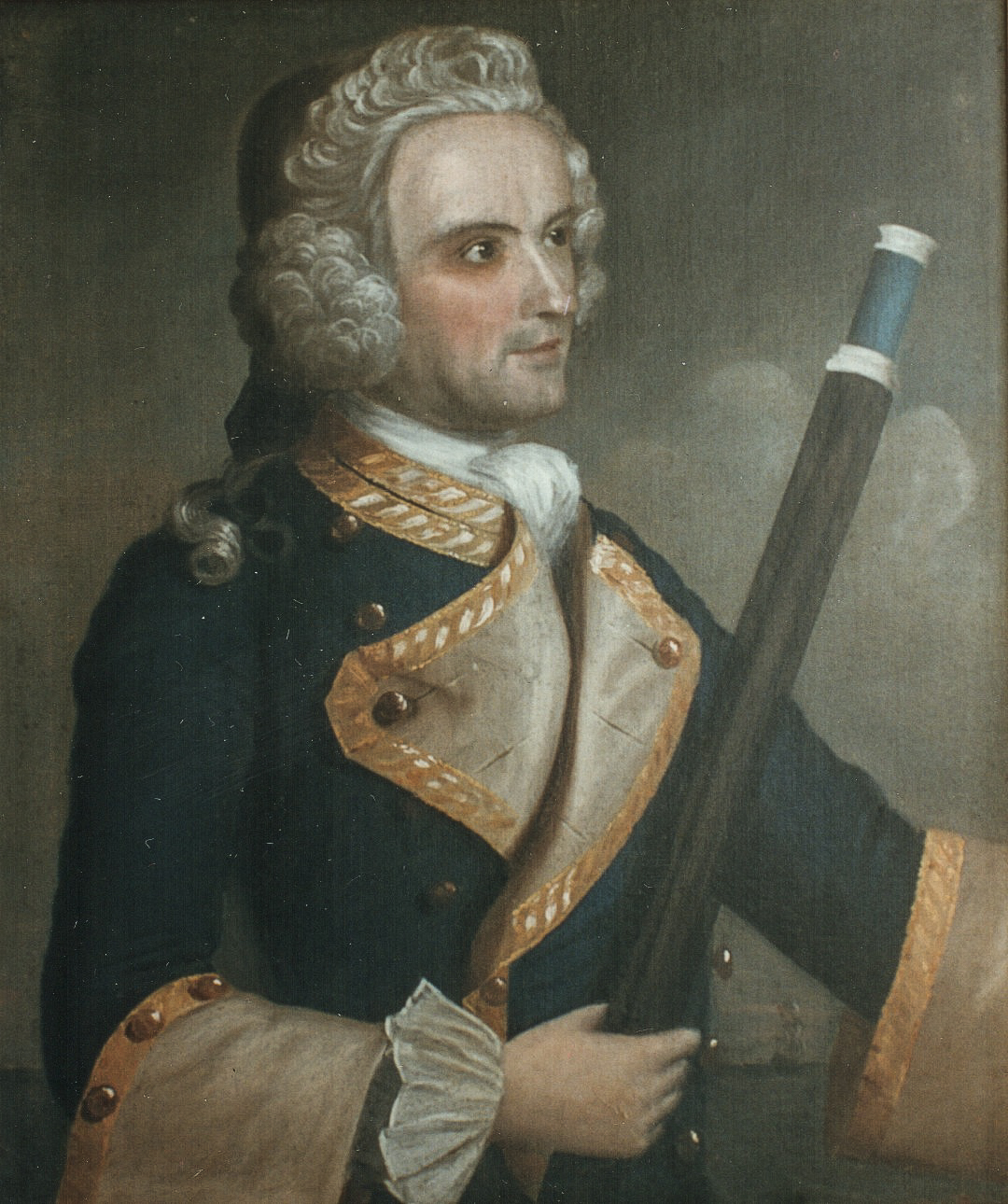
Commodore Charles Knowles, Governor of Louisburg

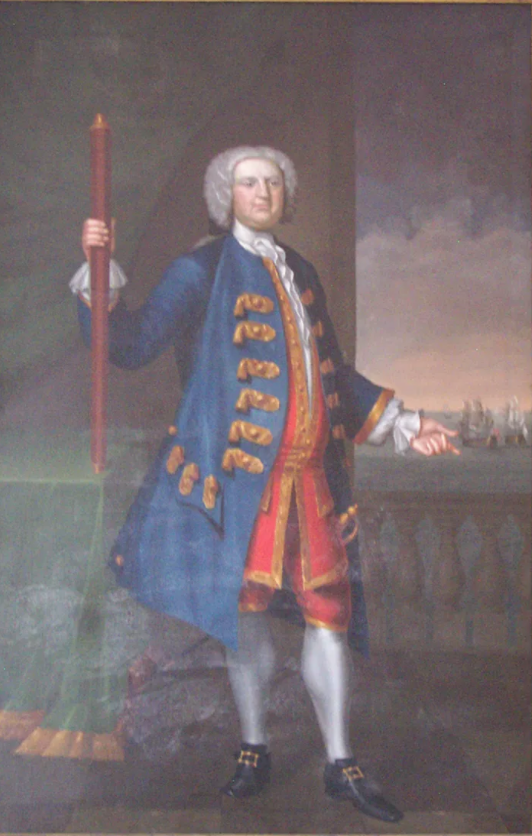
Sir Peter Warren, Hero of Louisbourg, by John Smibert

=== Hours ===
The Shaw Research Library and Randall Gallery are open to the public without charge.

- Tuesdays through Saturdays, 1 p.m. to 4 p.m.
- Or by special appointment

== See also ==
- National Register of Historic Places listings in Rockingham County, New Hampshire
