= USS Ranger (1777) =

Sloop of the Continental Navy

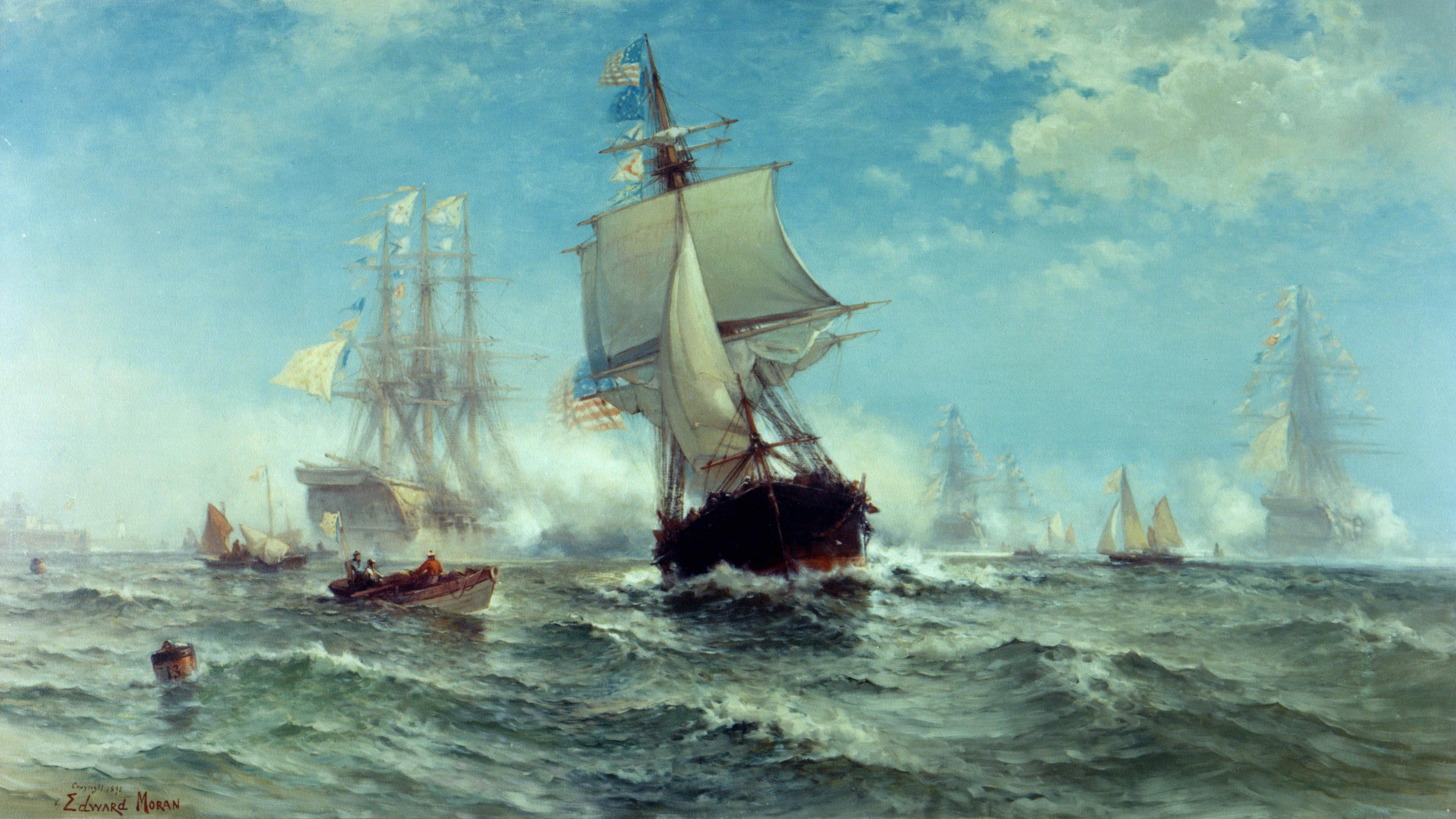
- USS Ranger receiving the salute of the French fleet at Quiberon Bay, France, 14 February 1778.

History

United States
- Name: USS Ranger
- Builder: James Hackett (shipbuilder), Badger's Island, Kittery, Maine
- Launched: 10 May 1777
- Captured: 11 May 1780

Great Britain
- Name: HMS Halifax
- Acquired: 11 May 1780
- Decommissioned: 1781

General characteristics
- Type: Sloop
- Displacement: 308 long tons (313 t)
- Length: 116 ft (35 m)
- Beam: 28 ft (8.5 m)
- Draft: 13 ft 6 in (4.11 m)
- Complement: 140 officers and enlisted
- Armament: 18 × 6-pounder guns

Service record
- Commanders: Capt. John Paul Jones (1777–1778)
- Operations: Siege of Charleston (1779–1780)
- Victories: North Channel Naval Duel (1778), captured 31 prizes worth well over $1,000,000

USS Ranger was a 18-gun sloop of the Continental Navy, serving from 1777 to 1780 and the first to bear her name. Built at Portsmouth Naval Shipyard on Badger's Island in Kittery, Maine, she is famed for the solo raiding campaign carried out by her first captain, John Paul Jones, during naval operations of the American Revolutionary War. In six months spent primarily in British waters, she captured five prizes (mostly merchantmen), staged a single failed attack on the English mainland at Whitehaven, and caused Royal Navy ships to be dispatched against her in the Irish Sea.

Jones was detached in Brest, France to take charge of the Bonhomme Richard, turning over responsibility for Ranger to his first officer, Lieutenant Thomas Simpson. Under Simpson, the Ranger went on to capture an additional twenty-four prizes across the Atlantic and along the U.S. coast throughout 1778 and 1779.

Receiving new orders in late 1779 to aid the American garrison at Charleston, South Carolina, during the British siege, she continued her raiding career until ultimately forced to anchor on the Cooper River, resulting in her capture on 11 May 1780, with the fall of the city. Renamed Halifax, she finished her active service as a Royal Navy ship and was decommissioned in 1781. Later that year, she was sold in Portsmouth, England to private buyers for use as a merchantman.

== History ==
Ranger (initially called Hampshire) was launched on 10 May 1777 by James Hackett, master shipbuilder, at the shipyard of John Langdon on what is now called Badger's Island in Kittery, Maine. Captain John Paul Jones was named her first commander.

=== Continental Navy ===
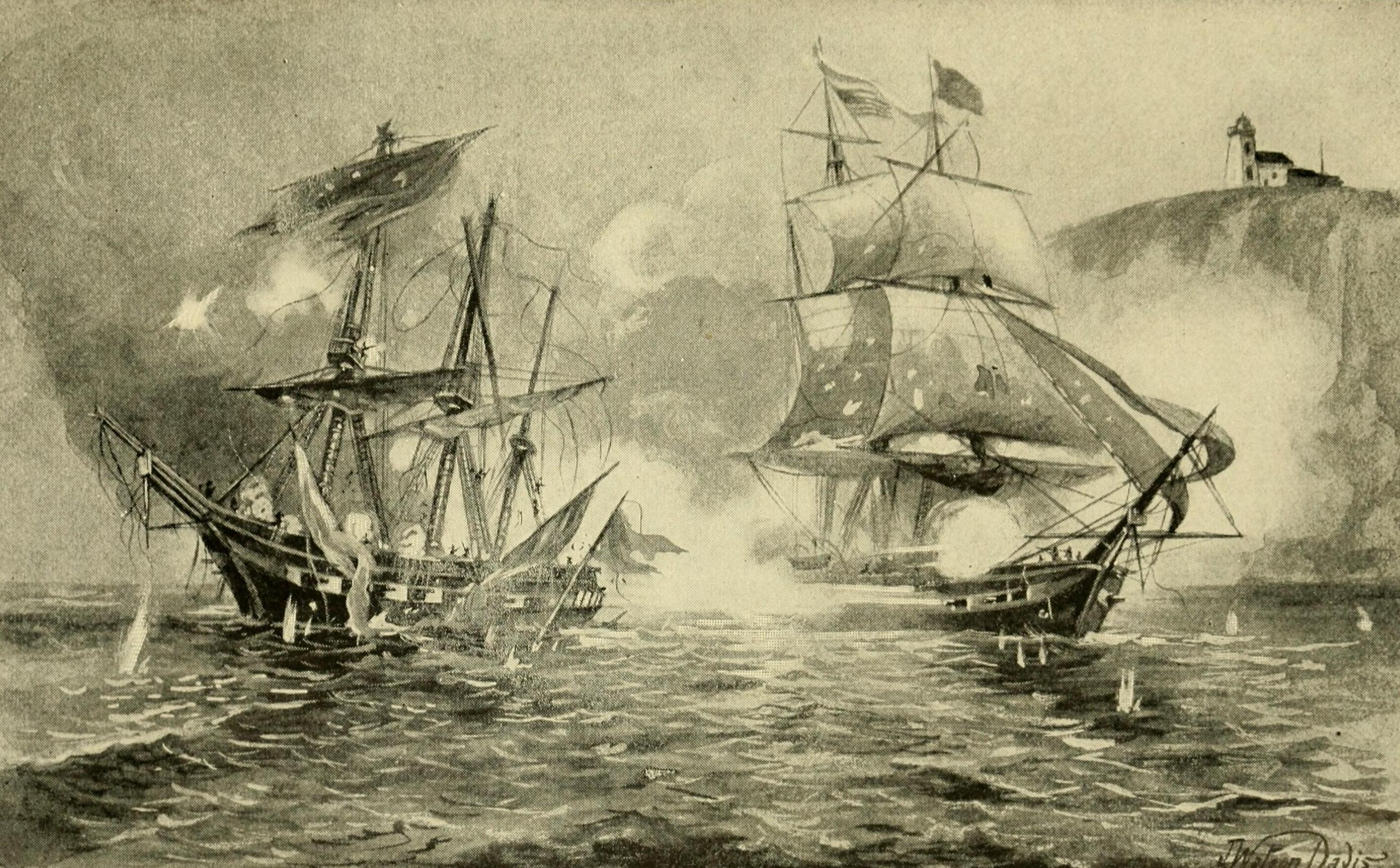
Ranger (right) at the North Channel Naval Duel

After fitting out, she sailed for France on 1 November 1777, carrying dispatches telling of British General John Burgoyne's surrender to the commissioners in Paris. On the voyage, two British prizes were captured. Ranger arrived at Nantes, France, on 2 December, where Jones sold the prizes and delivered the news of the victory at Saratoga to ambassador Benjamin Franklin. On 14 February 1778, Ranger received a nine-gun salute to the new American flag, the "Stars and Stripes" from the ship of the line Robuste, under Lamotte-Picquet, at Quiberon Bay. This was the first salute from a warship and the second to an American fighting vessel by a foreign power (the first salute was received by Andrew Doria when on 16 November 1776 she arrived at St. Eustatius and the Dutch island returned her 11-gun salute).

Ranger sailed from Brest 10 April 1778, for the Irish Sea and four days later captured the brigantine "Dolphin" between the Scilly Isles and Cape Clear and scuttled it. On 16 April, she took the ship "Lord Chatham" 5 leagues from Cape Clear and sent her to Brest. On 19 April she sunk a Scottish coastal schooner in the Mull of Galloway. On 20 April she sunk a sloop.Captain Jones led a raid on the English port of Whitehaven on 23 April, spiking the guns of the fortress but failing in his attempt to burn the ships in the harbor. Sailing across the bay to St. Mary's Isle, Jones planned to seize the earl of Selkirk and hold him as a hostage and use him to make several political demands. However, since the earl was absent, the plan failed. Several Royal Navy vessels were searching for Ranger, and Jones sailed across the North Channel to Carrickfergus, Ireland, to induce HMS Drake of 14 guns, to come out and fight on 24 April. Drake came out slowly against the wind and tide, and after an hour's battle, the battered Drake struck her colors, with eight sailors being killed in action during the engagement. Later on the same day she captured the brigantine "Patience". Having made temporary repairs and with a prize crew on Drake, Jones continued around the west coast of Ireland, capturing a lone storeship and arrived at Brest with her prizes on 8 May.

Jones was detached to command Bonhomme Richard, leaving Lieutenant Simpson, his first officer, in command. Ranger departed Brest on 21 August, reaching Portsmouth, New Hampshire, on 15 October, in company with Providence and Boston, plus three prizes taken in the Atlantic.

Ranger departed Portsmouth on 24 February 1779 joining with the Continental Navy ships Queen of France and Warren in preying on British shipping in the North Atlantic. Seven prizes were captured early in April and brought safely into port for sale. On 18 June, Ranger was underway again with Providence and Queen of France, capturing two West Indiamen in July and nine more vessels off the Grand Banks of Newfoundland. Of the 11 prizes, three were recaptured, but the remaining eight were sold with their cargoes for over a million dollars.

Ranger was ordered to Commodore Abraham Whipple's squadron, arriving at Charleston, South Carolina, on 23 December to support the garrison there under siege by the British. On 24 January 1780, Ranger and Providence, in a short cruise down the coast, captured three transports, loaded with supplies, near Tybee, Georgia. The British army tasked with capturing Charleston was also discovered in the area. Ranger and Providence sailed back to Charleston with the news. Shortly afterwards the British commenced the final push. Although the channel and harbor configuration made naval operations and support difficult, Ranger took a station in the Cooper River and was captured when Charleston fell on 11 May 1780.

=== Royal Navy ===
Ranger was taken into the British Royal Navy and commissioned under the name HMS Halifax. She was decommissioned in Portsmouth, England, in 1781, then sold as a merchant vessel for about 3 percent of her original cost.

== Specifications ==
Ranger's specifications were:

- Begun: 11 January 1777
- Launched: 10 May 1777, into the Piscataqua River
- Location: Rising Castle, now Badger's Island, Kittery, Maine
- Departed: 1 November 1777
- Builder: John Langdon
- Designer: James Hackett
- Yard Boss: Tobias Lear IV (father of Tobias Lear V, secretary to President George Washington)
- Officers:
  - John Paul Jones, Captain
  - Thomas Simpson, Portsmouth, 1st Lt
  - Elijah Hall, Portsmouth, 2nd Lt
  - Samuel Wallingford, Lt of Marines
  - Dr Ezrah Green, Dover, Surgeon
  - Mr Joseph Frazer Sr Officer of Marines
  - Capt Matthew Parke
- Crew: 145 men including nearly half from Piscataqua area
- Cost: $65,000 Continental dollars
- Rating: Sloop
- Rigging: Square rigged on all three masts with royals, topgallant, and a full set of studding sails
- Arms: 18 nine-pounder guns
- Painting: Topside black with broad yellow stripe and masthead
- Dimensions: (Recorded by Royal Navy after capture)
  - 97' 2" at gundeck (est. 110' overall)
  - 77' 9" keel
  - 27' 8" beam
  - 12' depth of hold
