= Badger's Island =

Small island in Maine

Coordinates: 43°4′55″N 70°45′9″W

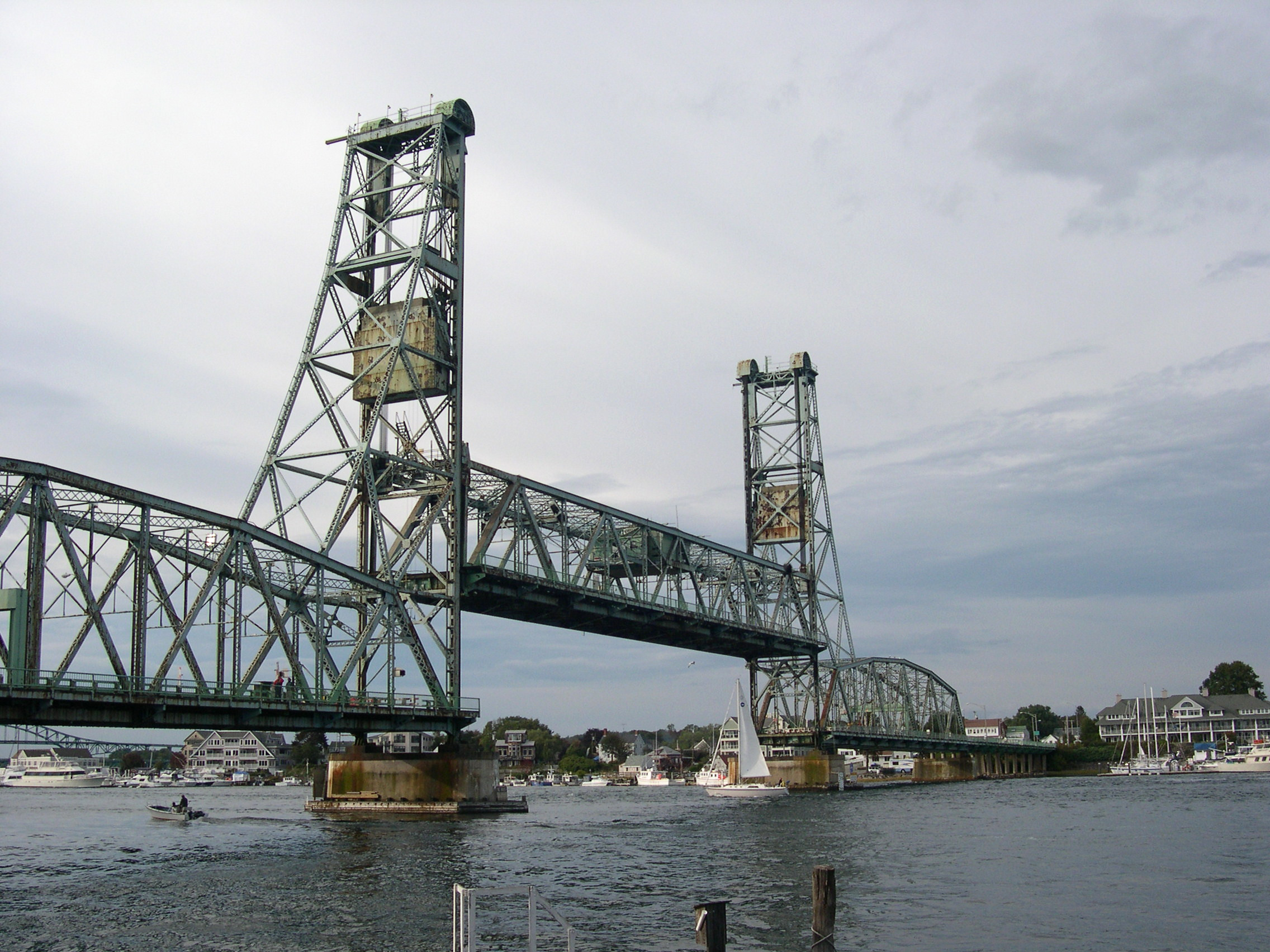
Memorial Bridge, looking toward Badger's Island

Badger's Island is located in the Piscataqua River at Kittery, Maine, United States, directly opposite Portsmouth, New Hampshire. It carries U.S. Route 1 between the states, connecting to the Kittery mainland by the Badger's Island Bridge, and to New Hampshire by the Memorial Bridge. Now largely a suburb of Portsmouth, the island features houses, condominiums, restaurants and marinas.

== History ==
=== Shipbuilding center ===
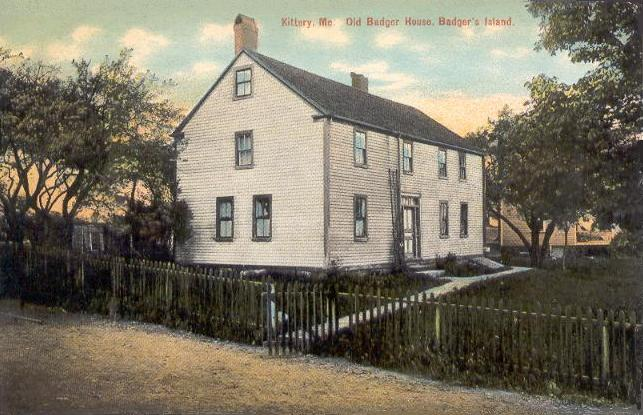
William Badger House in 1912, Badger's Island

Prior to the Civil War, Badger's Island was famous for shipbuilding. Eastern white pine for masts, together with lumber for hulls, arrived down the Piscataqua River from inland forests. Only two tenths of a mile (322 m) from Portsmouth's busy wharves, the island's gradual slope into the deep channel between was ideal for launching vessels. First called Rising Castle Island, it changed to Langdon's Island when John Langdon established his shipyard. The first U. S. Navy ships commissioned by the Continental Congress were built here by master shipbuilder James Hackett, including USS Ranger in 1777. One of his apprentices working on Ranger was William Badger. Acquiring 3 acres (12,000 m^{2}) on the island in 1797, he would dominate its shipbuilding until his death in 1830, launching more than 100 ships, including naval vessels, merchant vessels and privateers. The region produced many fine shipbuilders, including his nephew Samuel Badger, but William Badger, called Master Badger, is best known. He is buried on the island that bears his name.

In 1837, Frederick Fernald purchased Badger's shipyard. In 1844, he joined William Pettigrew to establish Fernald & Pettigrew, which would produce some 30 ships. Among their output was a series of clipper ships, including the Typhoon. Launched in 1851, Typhoon set a sailing record to Liverpool, England—13 days, 10 hours dock to dock. Known as the "Portsmouth Flyer," it was the largest merchant ship yet seen in that port. But Badger's Island would lose its importance as a shipbuilding center. The industry shifted downriver to Fernald's Island, home since 1800 to the Portsmouth Naval Shipyard.

U.S. Navy vessels built on Badger's Island:

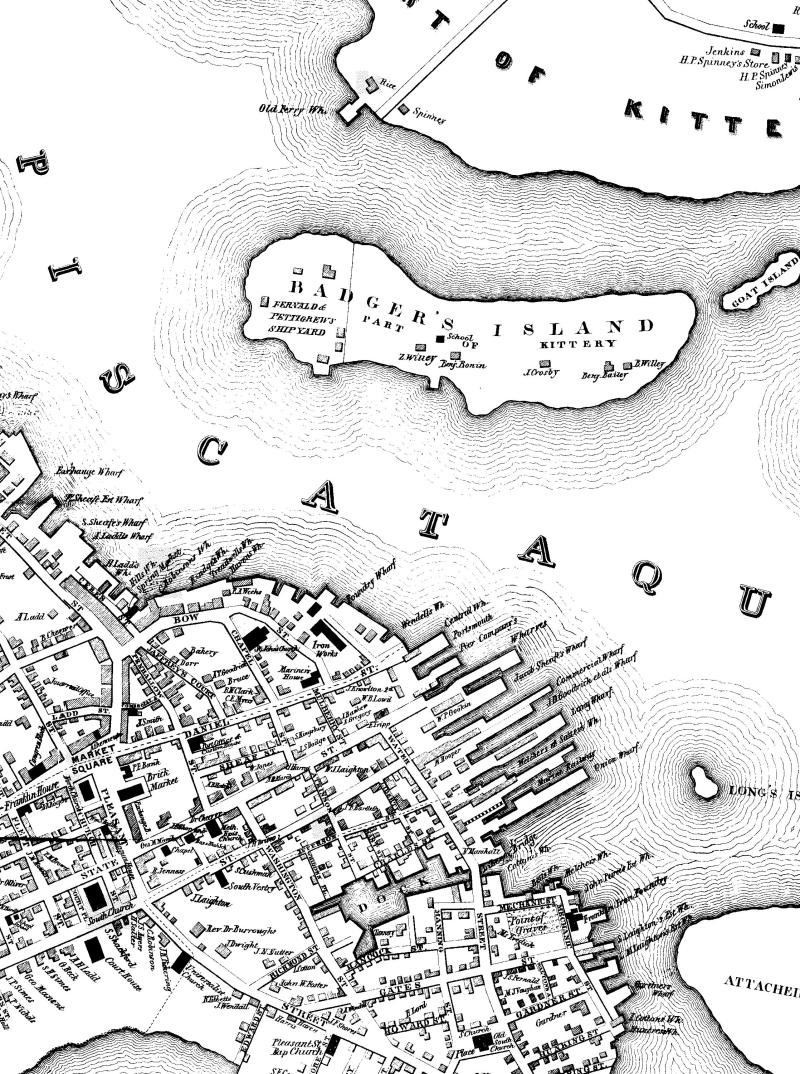
Map of Badger's Island, showing Fernald & Pettigrew Shipyard (1850)

- 1776 — Raleigh - (22-gun Frigate)—depicted on the Seal of New Hampshire
- 1777 — Ranger - (18-gun Sloop-of-war)—commanded by John Paul Jones
- 1782 — America - (74-gun Ship of the line)—presented by Congress to King Louis XVI
- 1791 — Scammel - (14-gun Schooner)—one of the first ten revenue service cutters
- 1797 — Crescent - (36-gun Frigate)—a tribute vessel for Algiers
- 1798 — Portsmouth - (24-gun Sloop-of-war)—funded by the citizens of Portsmouth
- 1799 — Congress - (38-gun Frigate)—fought in the War of 1812

Clipper Ships built by Fernald & Pettigrew:

- 1851 -- Typhoon, 1,611 tons
- 1852 -- Red Rover, 1,021 tons
- 1852 -- Young Australia, 766 tons
- 1853 -- Water Witch, 1,204 tons
- 1853 -- Dashing Wave, 1180 tons
- 1854 -- Express, 1073 tons
- 1854 -- Midnight, 962 tons
- 1855 -- Noonday, 1189 tons

=== Ferry terminus for electric railway ===
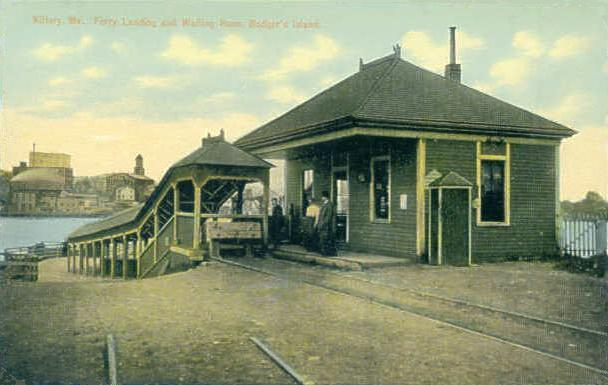
Ferry landing in 1912

Badger's Island became a terminus for the Kittery, a ferry which delivered passengers across the swift Piscataqua River from Portsmouth to the landing and waiting room of the Portsmouth, Kittery & York Street Railway. Beginning in 1897, the company ran trolleys through Kittery Point and across the salt marshes of Brave Boat Harbor to York Harbor and York Beach, the summer resort. In November 1901, it became part of the Portsmouth, Dover and York Street Railway. The trolley line remained in service until 1923 when the Memorial Bridge opened, the first bridge spanning the river without a toll. The section of Route 1 across the Badger's Island Bridge to Kittery's John Paul Jones Memorial Park, with its Sailors' and Soldiers' Monument by Bashka Paeff, was a City Beautiful plan to complement the Memorial Bridge.

== See also ==
- List of Maine railroads
- List of islands of Maine
- The Portsmouth Athenæum, which preserves the portrait, papers and half models of William Badger and other local shipbuilders
