= French corvette Hussard (1799) =

French naval corvette

Hussard
History

France
- Name: Hussard or Hussar
- Builder: Bayonne
- Launched: c. January 1799
- Captured: 20 August 1799

Great Britain
- Name: Surinam
- Acquired: 20 August 1799 by capture
- Captured: 23 June 1803

Batavian Republic
- Name: Suriname
- Acquired: 23 June 1803 by capture
- Captured: 1 January 1807

United Kingdom
- Name: Surinam or Sasnarang
- Acquired: 1 January 1807 by capture
- Fate: Struck from lists 1809

General characteristics
- Class & type: corvette or sloop
- Tons burthen: 413 (bm); 417½ (by calculation)
- Length: Overall: 105 ft 2 in (32.05 m); Keel: 86 ft 3 in (26.3 m)
- Beam: 30 ft 2 in (9.19 m)
- Depth of hold: 8 ft 5 in (2.57 m)
- Propulsion: Sails
- Sail plan: sloop
- Complement: French service:142; British service: 121
- Armament: French service: 20 × 9-pounder guns; British service: 18 × 6-pounder guns; Dutch service: 22 guns

The 20-gun French corvette Hussard (or Hussar) was launched in 1799 and the British captured her that same year when they captured Suriname. The Royal Navy took her into service as HMS Surinam, as there was already an HMS Hussar. The Dutch captured her in 1803, naming her Suriname, but the British recaptured her in 1807 and sent her to Britain. Thereafter she never again served on active duty. She disappeared from the Navy lists in 1809, but her fate is unknown.

== Capture ==
On 20 August 1799, a British invasion force under the command of Lieutenant-General Thomas Trigge and Vice Admiral the Right Honourable Lord Hugh Seymour arrived at the Dutch colony of Suriname. The British sent an ultimatum to surrender within 24 hours. The Dutch asked for 48 hours to consider it. They surrendered after the 48 hours. During the 48 hours Captain Pelatier decided to surrender her to USS Portsmouth and USRC Scammel that were also at Paramaribo. The crew was removed and a prize crew put on board. The American ships, searching for French vessels that had been preying on American merchantmen, had blockaded Hussar for two months in the Suriname River. The British demanded she be turned over to them and the Americans agreed after a brief confrontation, turning over the ship and prisoners. (The British also captured the Dutch brig-sloop Kemphaan, which they took into service under the name Camphaan.) The letter reporting the corvette's capture describes her as "The French Corvette L'Hussar, a very fine Vessel, only Seven Months old; mounts Twenty Nine-Pounders". The British renamed her Surinam and Lieutenant Christopher Cole, of Prince of Wales was appointed to command her.

== British service ==
Surinam then served on the Leeward Islands station. Over the period from late March to early April 1800 Cole captured two French privateers and recaptured a merchant schooner. First, on 24 March, he captured the sloop Consolateur, of one gun and 35 men. She had left Point-à-Pitre, Guadeloupe on a cruise. Second, two days later he captured the sloop Renard, of three guns and 15 men. She too had left Point-à-Pitre. Lastly, on 3 April he recaptured the schooner Lack.

Cole also introduced new regulations aboard his ship that kept his men in good health in the Caribbean Sea. In 1801, Seymour died from a fever, but Cole's activities had already been noticed by Sir John Thomas Duckworth who replaced Seymour and Cole was made a post captain on 30 June 1801 in Duckworth's flagship Leviathan. Cole's replacement was Lieutenant Randall MacDonnell. His replacement, in 1803, was Commander Robert Tucker (acting).

Commodore Sir Samuel Hood sent Tucker and Surinam on a mission to Saint-Domingue to try to secure the release of two British officers reportedly in the hands of the rebels at Gonaïves. On discovering that one of the officers had already been executed and that the other had escaped, Tucker then sailed to Jacmel, where he assisted the besieged French garrison. Two days after leaving Jacmel, Surinam sustained damage and Tucker then put in at Curaçao for repairs.

== Capture by the Dutch ==
While Tucker was at St Anna Bay, Curaçao, the Dutch found out, from a prize that Tucker had sent to Jamaica for news and that had returned, that war had been declared between Britain and Holland. The Dutch then seized Tucker and Surinam on 23 June, despite Tucker's best efforts to escape. (Note: James has an account that has Michael Fitton of Gipsey warning Tucker and Tucker acting imprudently. Fitton later repudiated James's report.) The Dutch first released Surinam's crew, and then Tucker and his officers, in hopes of an exchange of prisoners. Tucker himself spent some four months in close confinement in a dungeon. At his subsequent court-martial, Tucker was acquitted of all blame for the loss. However, the court-martial did reprimand Tucker for unofficerlike conduct in his dealings with the Dutch authorities. It ordered him to be put at the bottom of the list of Commanders; thereafter he never again was employed in the Royal Navy.

The Dutch took Surinam into service as Suriname.

== Recapture and fate ==
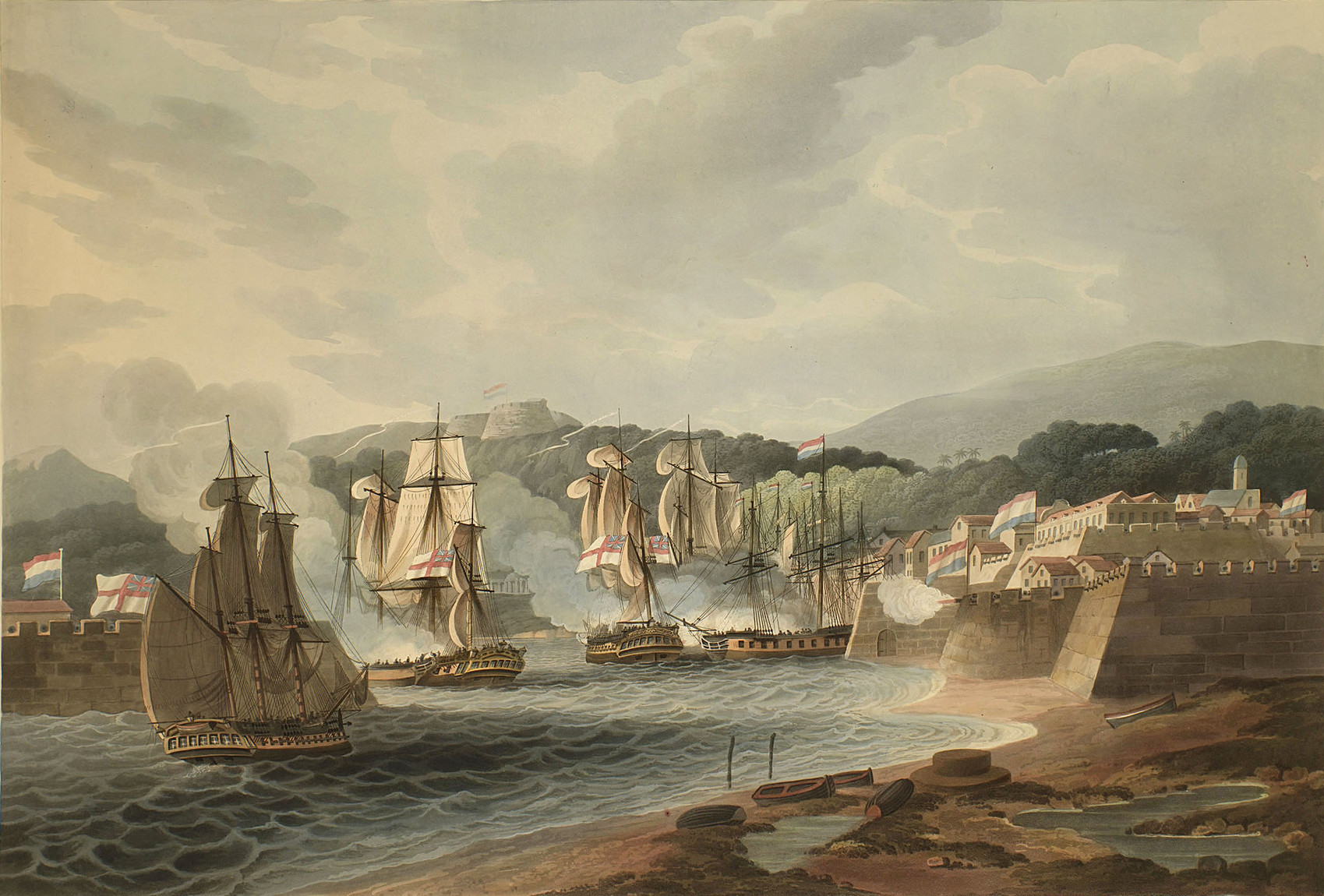
The capture of Curaçao on 1 January 1807

On 1 January 1807 Arethusa, Latona, Anson, Fisgard, and Morne Fortunee captured Curaçao, and with it Suriname. The Dutch resisted, and Suriname suffered five men wounded, including her captain, Jan Van Ness; one of the wounded died later. The British described her as having 22 guns. The British also captured the Dutch frigate "Kenau Hasselaar", which they took into service as Halstarr (or Halstaar). Her captain, Cornelius J. Evertz, had also commanded the Dutch naval force in Curaçao. In 1847 the Admiralty authorized the issue of the Naval General Service Medal with clasp "Curacoa 1 Jany. 1807" to the 65 surviving claimants from the action. Captain Charles Brisbane, captain of Arethusa and commander of the squadron, also received a gold medal.

In February 1807 Commander Henry Higman was appointed to command Surinam on the Jamaica station. Towards the end of the year he sailed her back to Britain. (Note: In 1806, Higman had briefly been captain of another Surinam.) Some records suggest that Suriname was later renamed Sasnarang, the Navy having already commissioned another Surinam. A more likely name is Samarang, Sir Edward Pellew in Psyché having captured several Dutch vessels at Samarang in August. Surinam (or Samarang or Sasnarang) saw no further active service. She remained on the Navy lists until 1809, but her eventual disposition is unknown.
