= James Hackett (shipbuilder) =

American shipbuilder

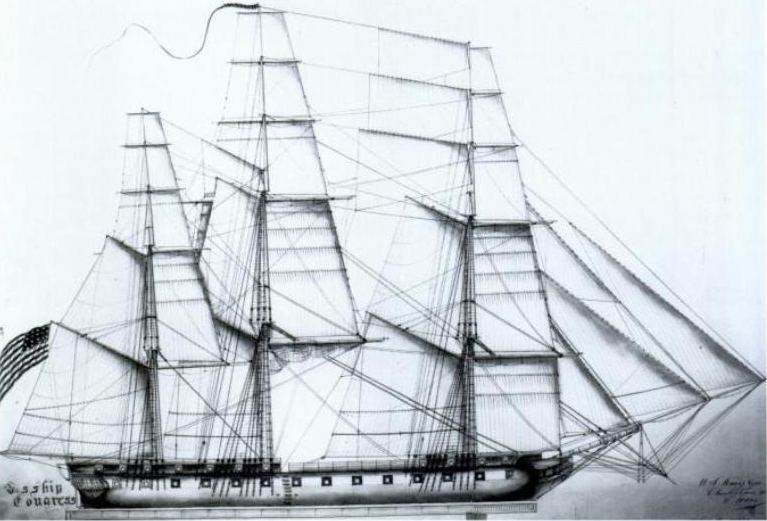
James Hackett's USS Congress, 1816 (Sail plan by Charles Ware)

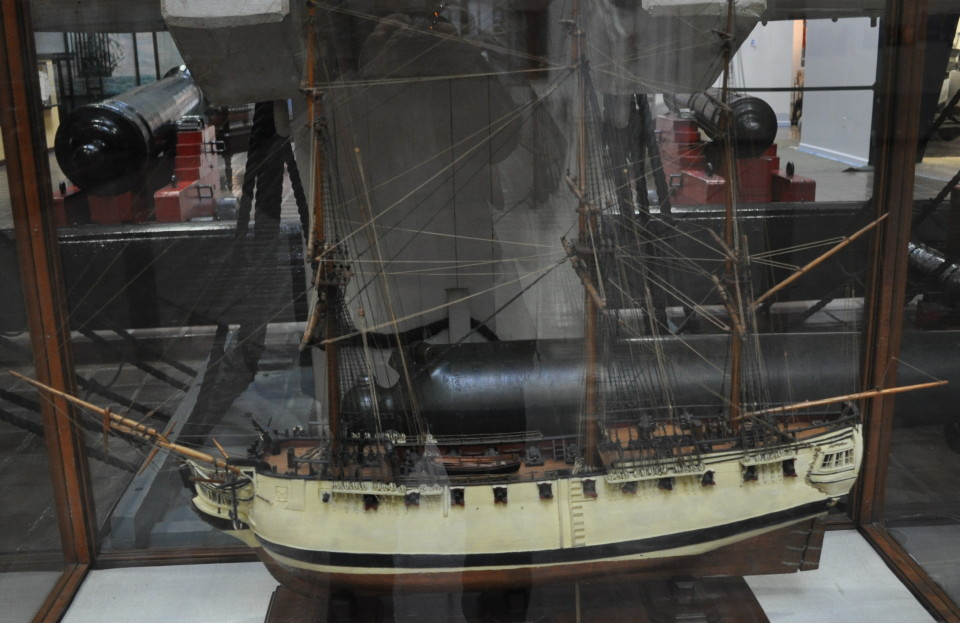
Model of the USS Raleigh

James Hackett (1739–1802) was an American shipbuilder in New Hampshire in the late 18th century. He was responsible for the construction of a number of significant Revolutionary War-era warships for the fledgling country, including the Raleigh, Ranger, America, Congress, Portsmouth, two cutters for the United States Revenue Cutter Service, as well as the Crescent, built for Algiers as tribute. As a teenager, he served with Rogers' Rangers during the French and Indian War. His later military service included serving as lieutenant colonel in the New Hampshire Militia during the Revolutionary War and after in several different units.

== Early life ==
Colonel James Hackett was born in Amesbury, Massachusetts on November 29, 1739, to a family of accomplished shipbuilders. He apprenticed as a merchant shipwright.

== French and Indian war ==
When he was only 15 years old he joined Rogers' Rangers. Hackett saw more brutal combat before the age of 21 than many career soldiers saw in a lifetime. In a small corps where promotion came hard, he earned the silver lace of a sergeant in John Stark's Company while still a teenager. He fought at the head of the British army as it pushed its way up Lake Champlain toward Canada. In 1758 he was one of two survivors of an 11-man patrol ambushed by an enemy war party numbering more than 50. A year later on August 27, 1759, Hackett himself was taken prisoner in the battle near St. John and remained a prisoner at Montreal until being released in a prisoner exchange on Nov 15, 1759. He continued to serve his company until Nov. 1, 1760, when it was disbanded.

== Living in Exeter, NH ==
Hackett lived and owned property in Exeter, New Hampshire from 1760 to 1802. He spent a lot of his professional career working at Langdon’s Shipyard in Kittery ME / Portsmouth NH. Later in life he moved to Brookfield, New Hampshire and sold the Exeter property in 1802.

== Service in the Revolutionary War ==
At the beginning of the American Revolution James Hackett participated in the raid at Fort William & Mary in New Castle, New Hampshire in December of 1774. Then as a Captain, he led a company of 108 men to Cambridge, Massachusetts, in April 1775 following the attacks on Lexington and Concord. On July 4, 1776, he was appointed Colonel in Wingate’s Regiment. He turned down command of a New Hampshire regiment in 1776 to “fit out” armed vessels built in New Hampshire. In 1778, he volunteered for duty under General Sullivan in Rhode Island in a company raised by Colonel John Langdon in Portsmouth and was made lieutenant. He served as Colonel in the battle Saratoga with Langdon’s New Hampshire Independent Company.

For his indispensable services, Hackett was given command of a battalion of artillery of three companies in Portsmouth. He had the honor of receiving General Washington with a “grand salute” at the occasion of his Excellency’s reception at Portsmouth on October 31, 1789.

== Shipbuilder for the Continental Navy ==
Colonel Hackett is best known as a Master Shipbuilder completing an incomparable list of vessels for the Continental Navy. With the assistance of his compatriots James Hill and Stephen Paul, he constructed the frigate RALEIGH, the ship that appears under construction on the seal and flag of the State of New Hampshire.

The frigate RALEIGH on the NH State Flag and Seal

He also built John Paul Jones famed sloop of war RANGER; the largest Continental warship of the Revolution, the ship of the line AMERICA; two early vessels of the service which was a forerunner to the United States Coast Guard, the United States Revenue Service cutters SCAMMEL II and the GOVERNOR GILMAN; the USS CONGRESS, which was one of the first six frigates of the United States Navy; a host of privateers and merchant vessels including the McCLARY, the PORTSMOUTH I, the BELLONA and the FREE TRADE; and the tribute ship frigate CRESCENT.

"...on March 20, 1784, John Langdon contracted with Major James Hackett of Exeter for 'a good well-built Ship' to be delivered at Langdon's Island 'finished to a cleat.' Hackett was to be paid as follows: “Four Hundred and Thirty Pounds in cash---three hogsheads rum at four shillings and six pence per gallon; five hogsheads molasses, at two shillings per gallon; one teirce coffee at one shilling and three pence per Lt.; fifteen barrels sugar at three pounds per hundred weight; two hundred weight of Bohea Tea, at four and six pence per pound. The remainder in any dry goods the said Langdon may have at two for one from the sterling cost." Quoted from William G. Saltonstall's book "Ports of Piscataqua".

== Later years living in Brookfield, NH ==
At some point prior to 1796 Hackett purchased a working farm and Tavern/Inn in Brookfield NH while he was still living in Exeter NH. Hackett's stepson, Hiram Hodge, was both an occupant and manager of the Tavern.

In 1801, Colonel James Hackett was discharged from the office of naval constructor due to the downsizing of the Navy. He moved full time to Brookfield probably in 1801.

Colonel James Hackett died in Brookfield in 1802 and at the time of probate his estate was valued as that of a well-to-do man.

In a September 16, 1806, article in the New Hampshire Gazette, when the property was auctioned by his son James Jr., Colonel Hackett's former site was described as follows: A "valuable and elegantly situated farm of 320 acres (200 clear), with good stone walls, 180 apple trees for cider, with a large handsome two story Dwelling House 38 by 46 feet in good repair, excellent well near the door, 2 good barns (one entirely new, 48 feet by 34, the other 106 by 34) and a convenient store 20 by 36 feet. Every kind of farm utensil will also be sold. The auctioneer, Mr. Cazneau Bayley of Portsmouth, noted the property was considered one of the best and most productive farms in New Hampshire, 52 head of horned cattle, besides sheep and horses, have been wintered and summered on said farm”.
