= USS America (1782) =

Ship of the line of the Continental Navy

History

United States
- Name: America
- Builder: Col. James Hackett
- Laid down: May 1777
- Launched: 5 November 1782
- Notes: Given to France upon launch.

France
- Acquired: 5 November 1782
- Fate: Scrapped due to dry rot, 1786

General characteristics
- Tonnage: 1982
- Length: 182 ft 6 in (55.63 m)
- Beam: 50 ft 6 in (15.39 m)
- Depth of hold: 23 ft (7.0 m)
- Propulsion: Sail
- Complement: 626
- Armament: 30 long 18-pounder guns; 32 long 12-pounders; 14 long 9-pounders

USS America was a 74-gun ship of the line of the Continental Navy. She never saw service in the Continental Navy, being given to the French Navy after launching.

== History ==
On 20 November 1776, the Continental Congress authorized the construction of three 74-gun ships of the line. One of these was America, laid down in May 1777 in the shipyard of John Langdon on Rising Castle Island (now Badger's Island) in Kittery, Maine, across the Piscataqua River from Portsmouth, New Hampshire.

However, progress on her construction was delayed by a chronic scarcity of funds and a consequent shortage of skilled craftsmen and well seasoned timber. The project dragged on for over two years under the immediate supervision of Col. James Hackett as master shipbuilder and the overall direction of John Langdon. Then, on 6 November 1779, the Marine Committee named Captain John Barry as her prospective commanding officer and ordered him to "...hasten, as much as will be in your power, the completing of that ship...."

Nevertheless, the difficulties which previously had slowed the building of the warship continued to prevail during the ensuing months, and little had been accomplished by mid-March 1780 when Barry applied for a leave of absence to begin on the 23rd. However he did perform one notable service for the ship. In November 1777, after inspecting the unfinished vessel which was slated to become his new command, he strongly recommended against a proposal, then under consideration, to reduce her to a 54-gun frigate. His arguments carried the day, and the Marine Committee decided to continue the work of construction according to the ship's original plans.

All possibility of Barry's commanding America ended on 5 September 1780 when he was ordered to Boston to take command of the 36-gun frigate Alliance which had recently arrived from Europe. Over nine months later, on 23 June 1781, Congress ordered the Continental Agent of Marine, Robert Morris, to get America ready for sea and, on the 26th, picked Captain John Paul Jones as her commanding officer. Jones reached Portsmouth on 31 August and threw himself into the task of completing the man-of-war. However, before the work was finished, Congress decided on 3 September 1782 to present the ship to King Louis XVI of France to replace the ship of the line Magnifique, which had run aground and been destroyed on 11 August 1782 while attempting to enter Boston Harbor. The ship was also to symbolize the new nation's appreciation for France's service to and sacrifices in behalf of the cause of the American patriots.

Despite his disappointment over losing his chance to command the largest warship yet built in America, Jones remained in Portsmouth striving to finish the new ship. The home in which he boarded is now known as the John Paul Jones House and is a National Historic Landmark. His labors bore fruit on 5 November 1782 when America – held partially back by a series of ropes calculated to break in sequence to check the vessel's acceleration, lest she come to grief on the opposite bank of the river – slipped gracefully into the waters of the Piscataqua. After she had been rigged and fitted out, the ship – commanded by M. le Chevalier de Macarty Martinge (who had commanded Magnifique when she was wrecked) departed Portsmouth on 24 June 1783 and reached Brest, France, on 16 July. Armed with a main battery of 18-pounder at a time when French 74's carried 24-pdr and 36-pdr guns, America would have a relatively weak broadside compared to other French ships-of-the-line.

Little is known of her subsequent service under the French flag other than the fact it was brief. A bit over three years later, she was carefully examined by a survey committee which found her damaged by dry rot beyond economical repair, probably caused by her wartime construction from green timber. She was accordingly scrapped and a much larger America with nearly twice her weight of shot was built to take her place.
