= USS Portsmouth (1798) =

U.S. Navy ship

History

United States
- Name: USS Portsmouth
- Namesake: Portsmouth, New Hampshire
- Builder: James Hackett
- Laid down: 4 July 1798
- Launched: 11 October 1798
- Fate: Sold 1801

General characteristics
- Type: Sloop-of-war
- Tonnage: 593 tons
- Length: 93 feet keel
- Beam: 31 feet
- Propulsion: Sails
- Complement: 220 officers and enlisted men
- Armament: 24 guns

USS Portsmouth was constructed for the United States Navy in 1798 by master shipbuilder James Hackett to a design of Josiah Fox at what is now Badger's Island in Kittery, Maine, directly across the Piscataqua River from Portsmouth, New Hampshire. She was built with funds contributed by the citizens of Portsmouth.

Commanded by Captain Daniel McNeil, Portsmouth operated in the West Indies during the Quasi-War with France in the squadron commanded by Commodore John Barry. Sometime before 9 August 1799, she captured French schooner La Fripponne. On 20 August 1799, a British invasion force under the command of Lieutenant-General Thomas Trigge and Vice Admiral the Right Honourable Lord Hugh Seymour arrived at the Dutch colony of Suriname. The British sent an ultimatum to surrender within 24 hours. The Dutch asked for 48 hours to consider it. They surrendered after 48 hours. During the 48 hours the Captain of French Navy corvette Hussar decided to surrender to her and USRC Scammel that were also at Paramaribo. The crew was removed, and a prize crew put on board. The American ships, searching for French vessels that had been preying on American merchantmen, had blockaded Hussar for two months in the Suriname River. The British demanded she be turned over to them and the Americans agreed after a brief confrontation, turning over the ship and prisoners. She arrived at New York 24 January 1800. In April 1800, she sailed to France to bring back the United States envoys who had concluded peace negotiations with France. She arrived at Le Harve on 20 May. She arrived at Norfolk, Virginia on or shortly before 12 December. In a letter dated 20 February to Josiah Parker, Chaiman of the Committee on Naval Affairs, Navy Secretary Stoddert recommended selling her. Portsmouth was sold at Baltimore, Maryland, for $34,365.82 in 1801, after the military cutbacks ordered by the new Jefferson Administration after the peace signed with France ending the Quasi-War in 1800.
