= USS Raleigh (1776) =

American Revolutionary warship

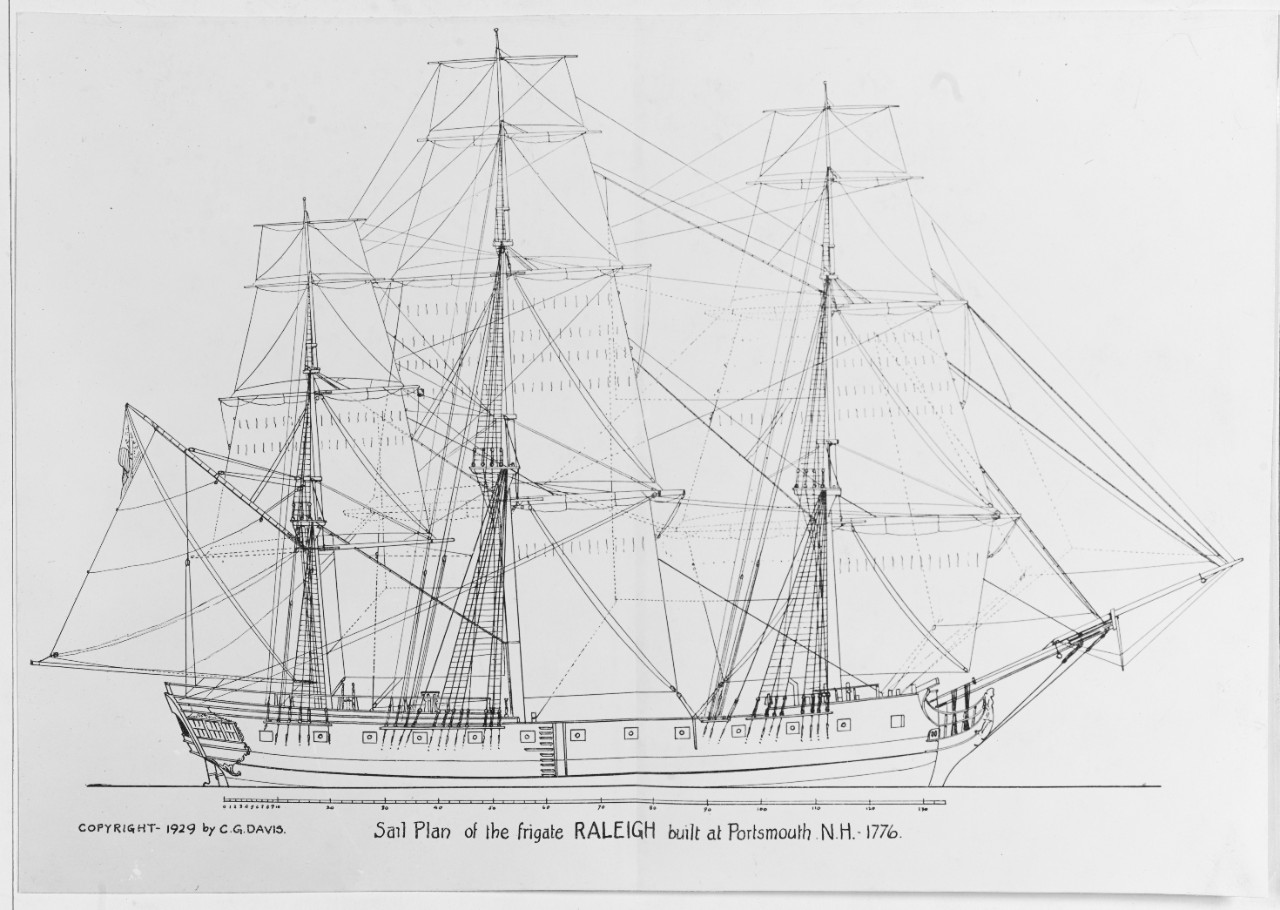
- 1929 sail plan of Raleigh by Charles G. Davis

History

United States
- Name: USS Raleigh
- Namesake: Sir Walter Raleigh
- Ordered: 1775
- Builder: Colonel James Hackett
- Laid down: 21 March 1776
- Launched: 21 May 1776
- Captured: 25 September 1778
- Fate: Grounded and abandoned

Great Britain
- Name: HMS Raleigh
- Launched: 28 September 1778 (refloated)
- Acquired: 25 September 1778
- Decommissioned: 10 June 1781
- Fate: Sold July 1781

General characteristics
- Class & type: Hancock Class, 32 gun Frigate
- Tons burthen: 697
- Length: 131 ft 5 in (40.06 m) keel 110 ft 7 in (33.71 m)
- Beam: 34 ft 5 in (10.49 m)
- Draft: 11 ft (3.4 m)
- Propulsion: Sail
- Complement: 180 officers and enlisted
- Armament: 32 × 12-pounders; also reported: 26 × 12-pdrs; 10 × 6-pdrs

USS Raleigh was a 32-gun frigate of the Continental Navy. She was one of the thirteen frigates that the Continental Congress authorized for the Continental Navy in 1775. Following her capture by the Royal Navy in 1778, she served as HMS Raleigh. The ship is featured on the flag and seal of New Hampshire.

== As USS Raleigh ==
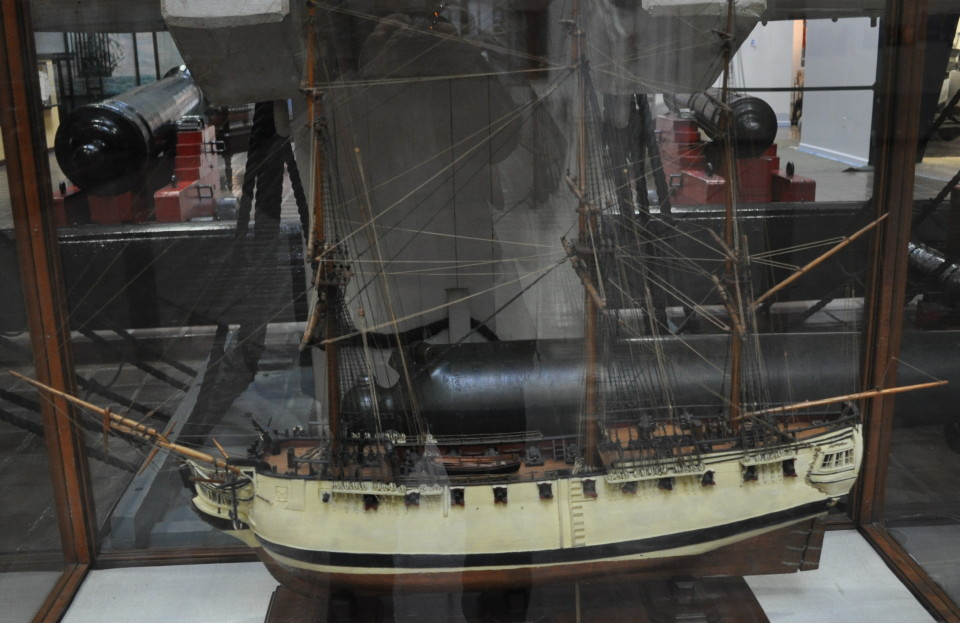
Model of Raleigh at the National Museum of the United States Navy

Raleigh, a 32-gun frigate, was authorized by Continental Congress on 13 December 1775. Built by Messrs. James Hackett, Hill, and Paul under supervision of Thomas Thompson, the keel was laid on March 21, 1776, at the shipyard of John Langdon on what is now Badger's Island in Kittery, Maine. She was launched on May 21, 1776.

With a full-length figure of Sir Walter Raleigh as figurehead, Raleigh put to sea under Captain Thomas Thompson, who also supervised her construction, on August 12, 1777. Shortly thereafter, she joined Alfred and sailed for France. Three days out they captured a schooner carrying counterfeit Massachusetts money. Burning the schooner and her cargo, except for samples, the frigates continued their transatlantic passage. On September 2 they captured the British brig, Nancy, and from her they obtained the signals of the convoy which the brig had been escorting from the rear. Giving chase, the Americans closed with the convoy on September 4, 1777. Raleigh, making use of the captured signals, intercepted the convoy and engaged HMS Druid. In the ensuing battle she damaged Druid, but the approach of the other British escorts, HMS Camel and Weazel forced her to retire.

On 28 September she and Alfred captured brig Sally.

On December 29, 1777, Raleigh and Alfred, having taken on military stores, set sail from L'Orient, France, following a course that took them along the coast of Africa. After capturing the British vessel Granville off the bar of the Senegal River, Raleigh crossed the Atlantic Ocean to the West Indies. On March 9, 1778, in the Lesser Antilles, Alfred, some distance from Raleigh, was captured by the British ships HMS Ariadne and Ceres. Raleigh, unable to reach Alfred in time to assist her, continued north and returned to New England early in April 1778.

Accused of cowardice and dereliction of duty for not aiding Alfred, Captain Thompson was suspended soon after reaching port. On May 30, 1778, the Marine Committee appointed John Barry to replace him as captain. Barry arrived in Boston to assume command on June 24 only to find his ship without crew or stores and the Navy Board not wholly in support of the manner of his appointment. His reputation and character, however, neutralized the ill-will of the Marine Committee, drew enlistments, and helped to obtain the stores. On September 25, Raleigh sailed for Portsmouth, New Hampshire, with a brig and a sloop under convoy. Six hours later two strange sails were sighted. After identification of the ships as British the merchant vessels were ordered back to port. Raleigh drew off the pursuing ships. Through that day and the next the British ships HMS Unicorn and Experiment pursued Raleigh. In late afternoon on the 27th, the leading British ship closed with her. A seven-hour running battle followed, much of the time in close action. About midnight, the British hauled off and Barry prepared to conceal his ship among the islands of Penobscot Bay.

The British, however, again pressed the battle. As Raleigh opened fire, Barry ordered a course toward the land. Raleigh soon grounded on Wooden Ball Island, part of Matinicus. The British hauled off but continued the fight for a while, then anchored. Barry ordered the crew ashore to continue the fight and to burn Raleigh. A large party, including Barry, made it to shore. One boat was ordered back to Raleigh to take off the remainder of the crew, and destroy her, however the British again fired on the ship, striking the Continental colours. The battle was over. All three ships had been damaged, Unicorn particularly so. Of the Americans ashore, a few were captured on the island, but the remainder, including Barry, made it back to Boston, Massachusetts, arriving on October 7.

== As HMS Raleigh ==
The British refloated Raleigh at high tide on the 28th, and after repairs, commissioned her into the Royal Navy as HMS Raleigh. She continued to fight during the American Revolutionary War as a British vessel and took part in the siege of Charleston in May 1780. She was decommissioned at Portsmouth, England, on June 10, 1781, and was sold in July 1783.

== Legacy ==
Raleigh is depicted on the flag and seal of New Hampshire.

== Bibliography ==
- Dept U.S.Navy. "USS Raleigh (1776)". Dictionary of American Naval Fighting Ships. Department of the Navy -- Naval Historical Center. Archived from the original on October 5, 2001.
- Preble, George Henry (1892). History of the United States Navy-yard, Portsmouth, N. H. U.S. Government Printing Office, Washington. pp. 12-13.
