= Flag and seal of New Hampshire =

U.S. state flag and seal

State of New Hampshire
- Use: Civil and state flag
- Proportion: 2:3
- Adopted: 1909; 117 years ago Modified January 1, 1932
- Design: A state seal wrapped by a golden laurel wreath with nine stars on a blue field.
- Designed by: Helen Seavey

Great Seal of the State of New Hampshire

Versions
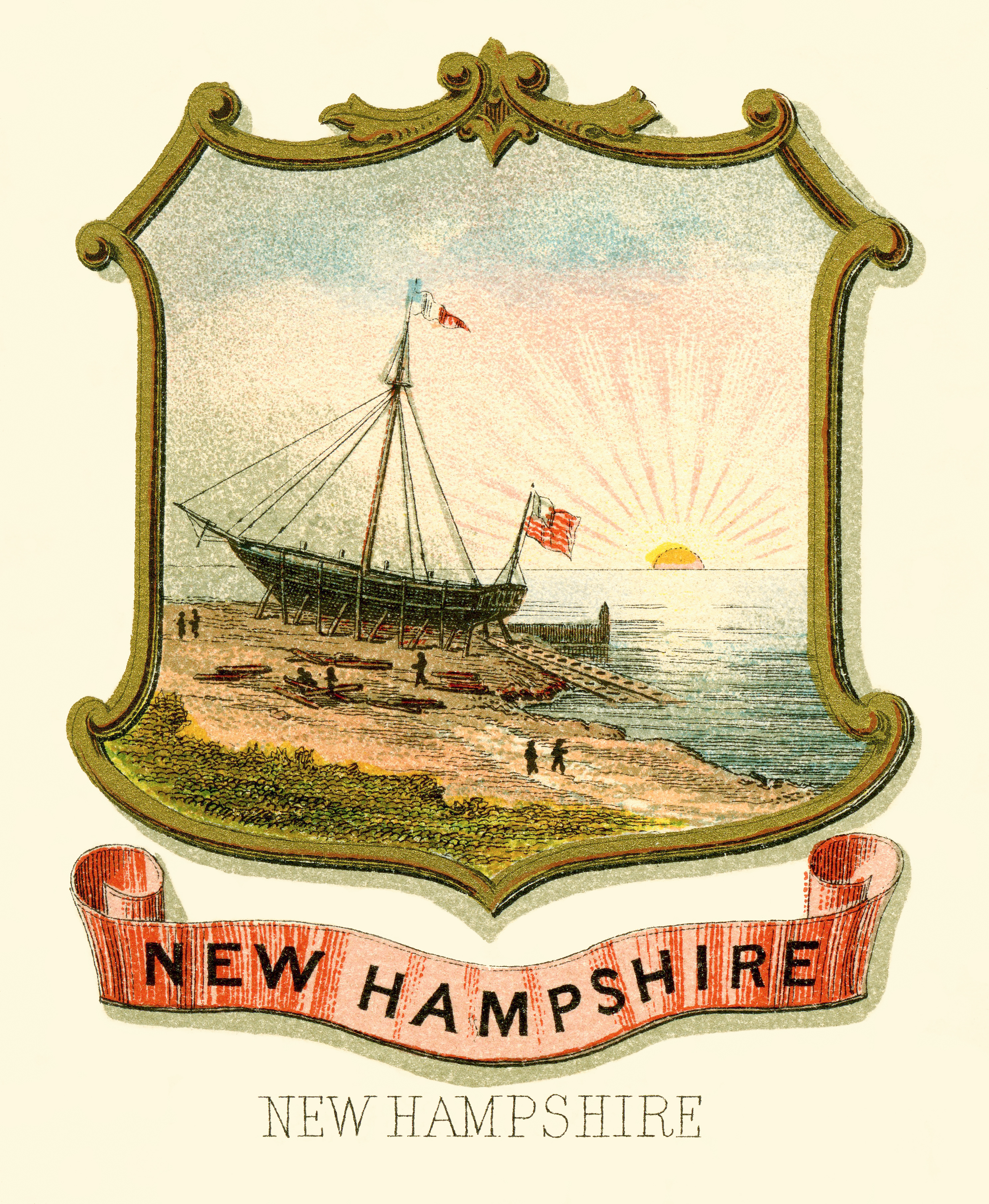
- Historical coat of arms (1876)
- Armiger: State of New Hampshire

The seal of New Hampshire, codified by law in 1931, features the frigate USS Raleigh, encircled by a laurel wreath and nine stars. A granite boulder appears in the foreground, while water represents the harbor of Portsmouth. The U.S. state of New Hampshire has held two seals since it declared its independence from Great Britain on January 5, 1776.

The flag of New Hampshire, adopted in 1909, consists of the state seal centered on a blue field. It is currently unique among U.S. state flags for including the Stars and Stripes within the seal.

== Seal history ==
New Hampshire's current constitution took effect in 1784, accompanied by a revised state seal depicting a ship under construction with a rising sun in the background, to reflect Portsmouth's prominence as a shipbuilding center during the American Revolutionary War.

In 1919, Otis G. Hammond, Director of the New Hampshire Historical Society, prepared a formal history of the state seal and flag at the direction of the Governor and Executive Council, wrote a history of the state seal and flag. Here, Hammond detailed how the lack of a specific legal description had allowed considerable variation in seal designs. Over time, successive engravers had introduced additional elements, including various goods on the dock and, in some instances, figures standing beside them.

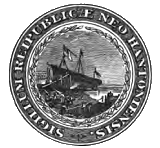
1904 seal retaining Latin inscription

So, in 1931, during Governor John G. Winant's second term, a committee was appointed to produce a standardized, noncontroversial seal. The General Court approved the committee's recommendations, and a statute codifying the official design took effect on January 1, 1932 The law designated the frigate Raleigh, built in Kittery, Maine in 1776, as one of the first warships of the Continental Congress as the central element of the seal. It replaced the former Latin inscription with "SEAL OF THE STATE OF NEW HAMPSHIRE", specified a diameter of 2 inches in diameter, and declared that only a granite boulder appear in the foreground.

The law requires the scene to include:

- a straight horizon line of the sea across the field,
- a rising sun visible above the horizon for about one-third of its diameter,
- the ship shown broadside on the stocks, bow higher than the stern,
- masts, tops, shrouds, and stays in place,
- the 1777 U.S. flag on the stern staff, and pennants flying from jury masts,
- the foreground divided into land and water by a double diagonal line,
- no detail anywhere on the water, and only a single granite boulder on the land, and
- the inscription "SEAL • OF • THE • STATE • OF • NEW HAMPSHIRE", encircling the design and separated by round periods, with *"1776" flanked by two stars at the bottom.

=== The Colony and First State Seals ===
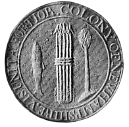
Colony Seal

When New Hampshire's First Provincial Congress assembled in Exeter on July 1, 1775, it quietly swept aside its royal trappings, including the George III seal previously in use. In preparation of the 1776 state constitution, the First Provincial Congress designed a seal measuring 1½ inches in diameter and depicting an upright fish and pine tree on either side of a bundle of five arrows. The fish and pine represented the main trade of the colony and the five arrows represented each of the five counties. The seal bore the inscription: COLONY OF NEW HAMPSHIRE * VIS UNITA FORTIOR. As the colony prepared to draft its 1776 constitution, delegates created a new emblem: a 1½-inch seal depicting a fish and a pine tree flanking a bundle of five arrows. These figures represented the colony's main trades, while the arrows represented the five counties. Around them was inscribed the motto: "Vis Unita Fortior" meaning "a united force is stronger". Though never formally proclaimed, the seal appeared on military commissions starting in September 1775 and seems to have been in used until early July 1776. The General Court still prints it today beside the modern seal in copies of the state constitution.

Soon after declaring statehood, New Hampshire adopted its first official state seal on September 12, 1776. Larger at 1¾ inches, it preserved the pine, the fish, and the five arrows but added "Sigill Rei-Pub Neohantoni" to the inscription. Some members of the General Court still use it, even though no statute currently governs its design.

== Flag statute ==
The 2024 New Hampshire Revised Statutes, Title I, Chapter 3, § 3:2 defines the state flag as follows:

The body or field shall be blue and shall bear upon its center in suitable proportion and colors a representation of the state seal. The seal shall be surrounded by a wreath of laurel leaves with nine stars interspersed.

== Flag history ==
=== Pre-official flags ===
In 1786, the state legislature came up with a committee to outline a state flag for local militia units. After a short time the committee adopted a design. It had a dark purple field with a white ground. In the middle of it was an oval shield encircled with a laurel. Inside the laurel was an illustration of a man armed with a sword an in a defensive position with the motto: "Freedom, Not Conquest." In 1892, the state legislature change the flag to one with the coat of arms of the state.

In December of 1808, the state passed a law making it the only one responsible for making and paying for the regimental colors carried by state troops. In 1820 and 1842 the flag was change to have a red silk field with name of the regiment or company in white.

During the American Civil War, state did not have and official flag for its troops so the Governor and a council assisted by the Adjutant-General came up with a design. The flag had a white silk field with a golden fringe around the border in the center was the states coat of arms done up in paint, with emblems of either infantry or artillery besides it. While on the other side is a painting of the national coat of arms with the name of the state and regiment.

In 1868, the Adjutant-General sent an outline for regimental flags infantry and cavalry units. It was described as bearing the letters "NH" and the state seal also with "US" and the national coat of arms.

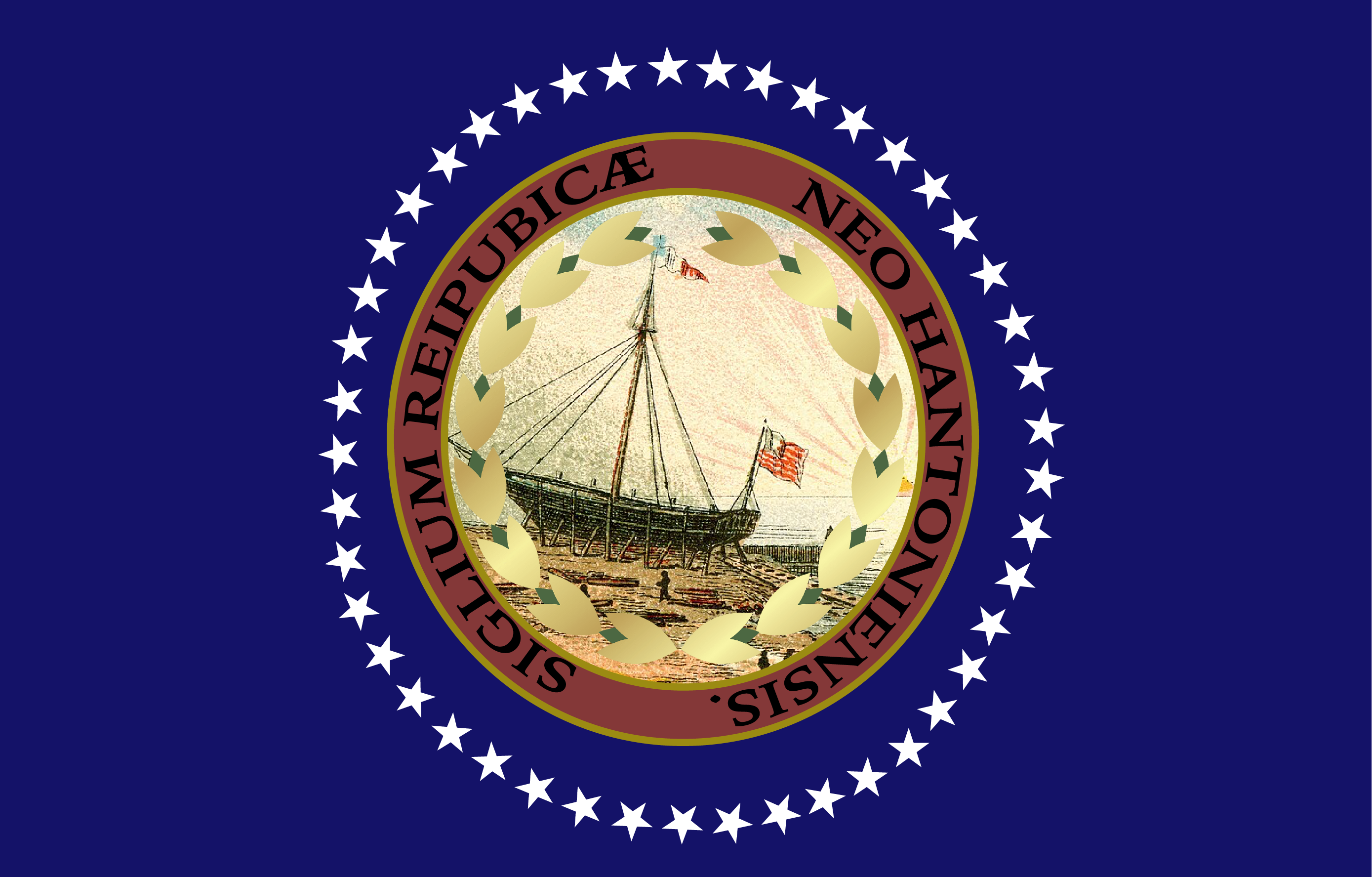
State flag with a 45 star ring, c1896-1907

An example of a pre-standardization design is a New Hampshire state flag produced by Lamprell & Marble of Boston between approximately 1896 and 1907. This flag featured a hand-painted state seal surrounded by a ring of 45 hand-sewn stars.

In 1908, 1st New Hampshire Infantry replaced their old state flag with a new one. The old state flag was described as bearing a field of gold.

In 1916, Governor Rolland H. Spaulding of New Hampshire presented the 1st New Hampshire Infantry Regiment, then stationed in Laredo, Texas, with a new flag. The regimental flag consisted of a blue field bearing the state seal of New Hampshire with the coat of arms of the United States. A representative of the governor was designated to present the colors, with Colonel Healy accepting them at Camp New Hampshire on behalf of the regiment.

=== Current flag (1909-present) ===
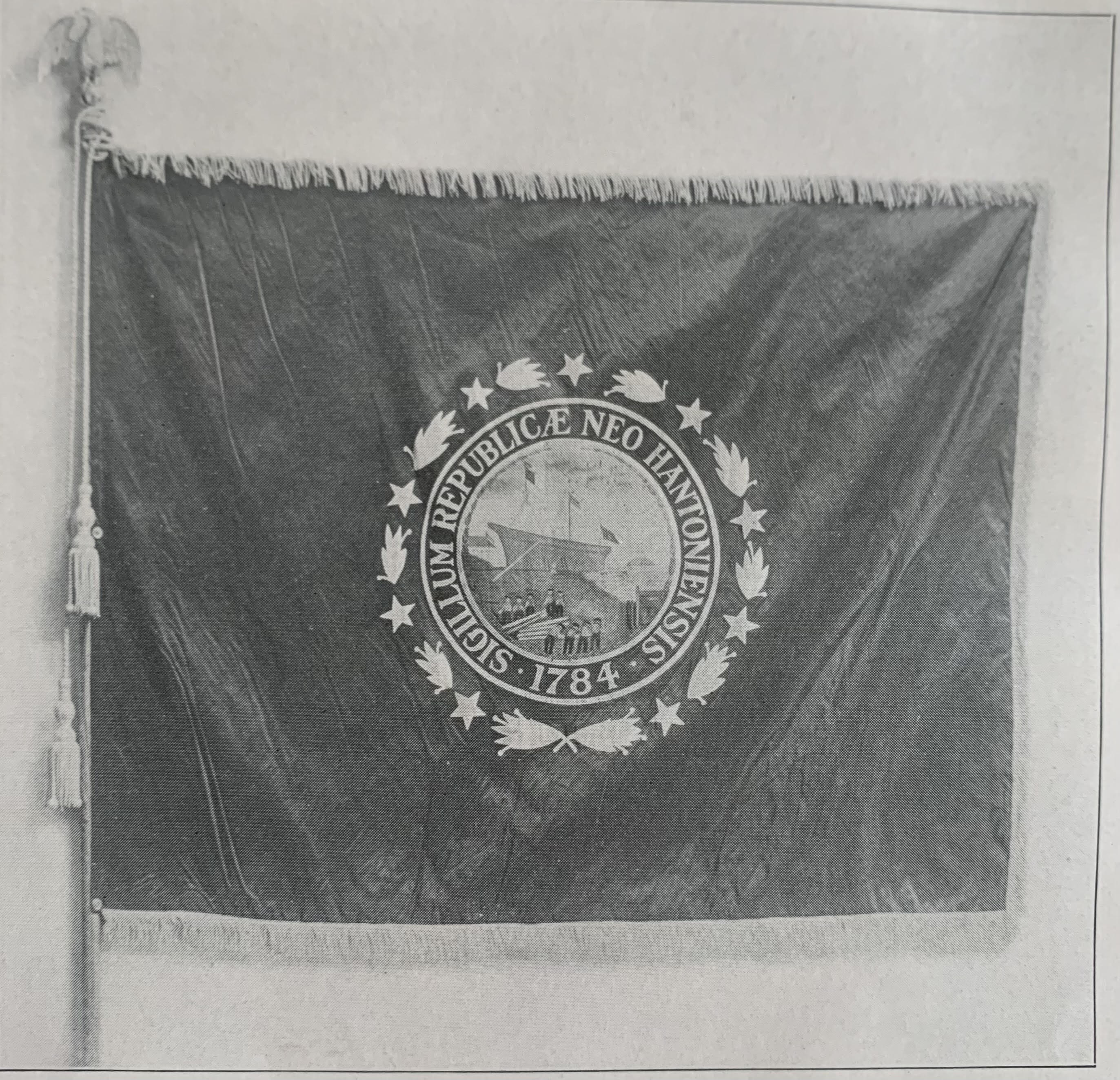
State flag from 1916

The New Hampshire state flag as depicted in the 1976 bicentennial postage stamp series.

The state flag of New Hampshire was designed by Helen Seavey, who based the design on the banners carried by the National Guard and an earlier design by Mr. Frisbees.

A 2001 internet poll run by the North American Vexillological Association ranked New Hampshire state flag's design as 63rd out of 72 flags of U.S. states, U.S. territories and provinces and territories of Canada.

New Hampshire is currently the only U.S. state whose flag includes a depiction of the Stars and Stripes.

=== Flag proposals ===
Tim McGough's proposed flag for New Hampshire (2023).

In 1909, Mr. Frisbees of the Sons of the American Revolution proposed a state flag. The flag was twice as long as it was wide. It had a white field with the state seal and an illustration of the Old Man of the Mountain in blue right in the middle. The centerpiece was surrounded by 9 golden stars.

Timothy Josephson, a former member of the New Hampshire House of Representatives suggested replacing the state seal in the center of the flag with the Old Man of the Mountain in 2018 to memorialize its collapse in 2003, but no official action has been taken on the proposal.

In November 2023, state representative Tim McGough proposed a bill that would have modified the flag to add the motto "Live Free or Die" in Times New Roman beneath the seal. The bill was rejected in February 2024.

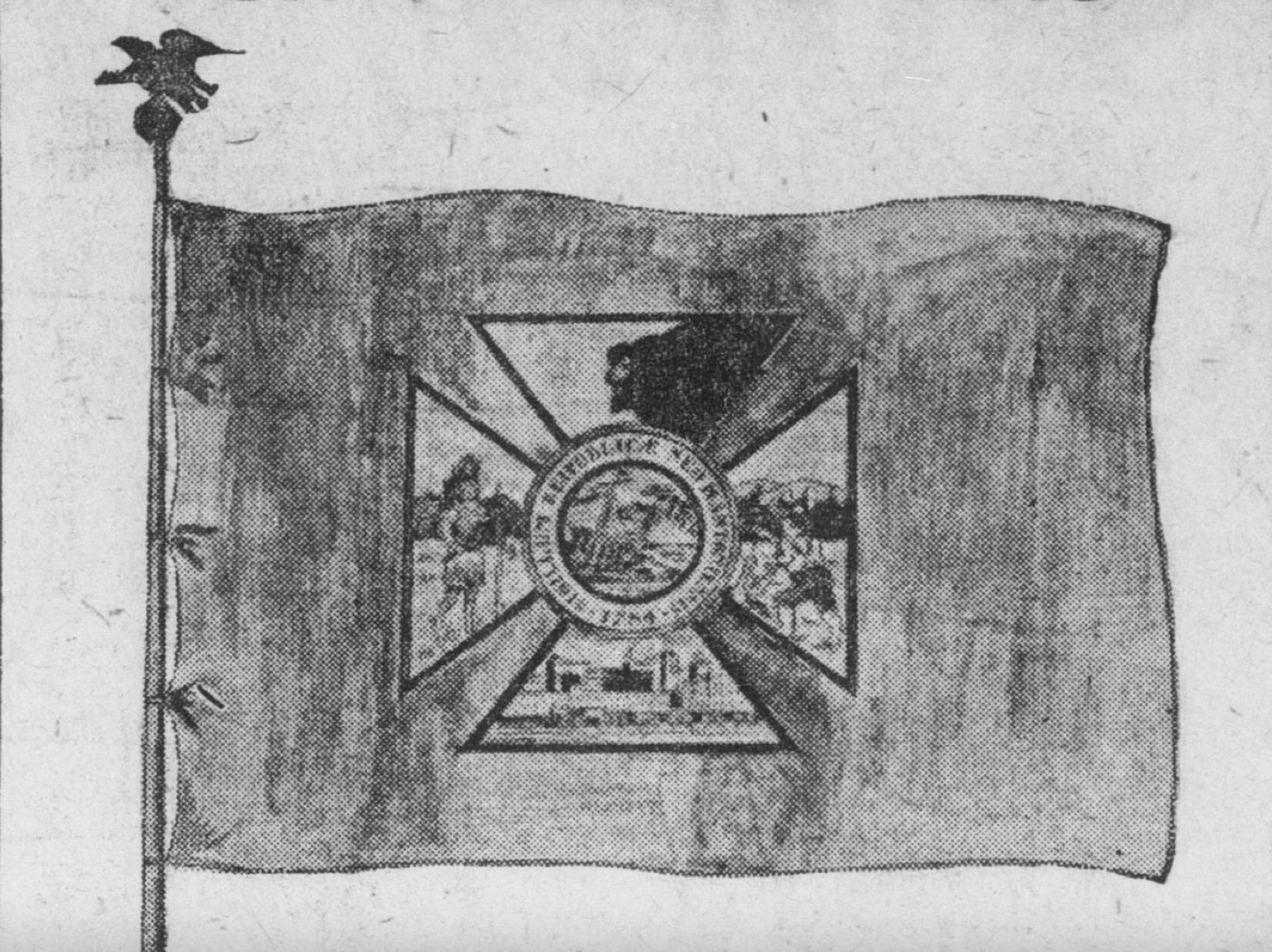
C. B. Spofford's proposed state flag, 1909
