= Greenland, New Hampshire =

- Aerial view (2026)

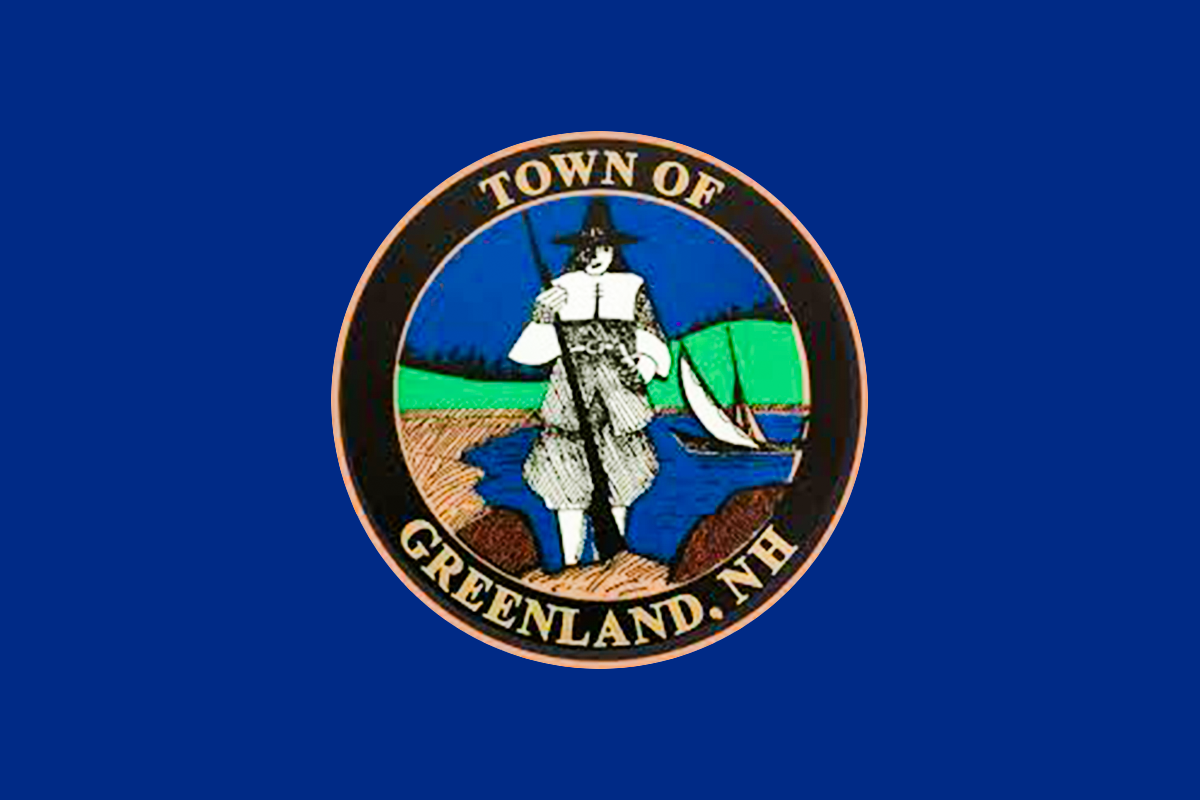
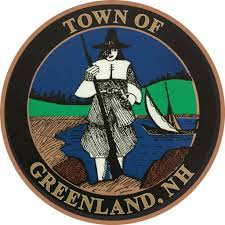
- Flag Seal

- Location in Rockingham County and the state of New Hampshire
- Coordinates: 43°02′10″N 70°49′58″W
- Country: United States
- State: New Hampshire
- County: Rockingham
- Incorporated: 1721

Area
  - Total: 13.3 sq mi (34.5 km^{2})
  - Land: 10.5 sq mi (27.2 km^{2})
  - Water: 2.8 sq mi (7.3 km^{2}) 21.29%
- Elevation: 59 ft (18 m)

Population (2020)
  - Total: 4,067
  - Density: 388/sq mi (149.8/km^{2})
- Time zone: UTC-5 (Eastern)
  - Summer (DST): UTC-4 (Eastern)
- ZIP code: 03840
- Area code: 603
- FIPS code: 33-31700
- GNIS feature ID: 873612
- Website: www.greenland.nh.gov

Greenland is a town in Rockingham County, New Hampshire, United States. The population was 4,067 at the 2020 census, up from 3,549 at the 2010 census. It is drained by the Winnicut River and bounded on the northwest by Great Bay.

== History ==
One of the earliest settlements in the state, Greenland was a parish of Portsmouth (then called Strawbery Banke) operating in 1638. Captain Francis Champernowne moved from Strawbery Banke in 1640 and settled in the area of the present Portsmouth Country Club. Although it was originally to be called "Canary", he would call his farm "Greenland". His extensive landholdings included a farm which is now the town of Madbury, named for his ancestral home in Devon, England.

Residents requested and were granted a separate parish in 1706. In c. 1710, Captain Samuel Weeks constructed a substantial brick house, thought to be the oldest brick house in New Hampshire still standing. It survived the 1755 Cape Ann earthquake. Only the 18-inch-thick (46 cm) beams that supported the structure were cracked during the quake. The Weeks House is denoted by a New Hampshire historical marker (number 113) along New Hampshire Route 33.

Greenland incorporated in 1721. The town annexed parts of Stratham in 1805 and 1847.

On September 1, 1824, the Marquis de Lafayette was received by the citizens of Greenland at a triumphal arch erected in front of the local hotel.

== Geography ==
According to the United States Census Bureau, the town has a total area of 13.3 square miles (34.5 km^{2}), of which 10.5 square miles (27.2 km^{2}) are land and 2.8 square miles (7.3 km^{2}) are water, comprising 21.29% of the town. The highest point in Greenland is Breakfast Hill, at 151 feet (46 m) above sea level, on the town's border with Rye. Greenland is abutted by Great Bay to the north and is primarily drained by the Winnicut River. Greenland lies fully within the Piscataqua River (Coastal) watershed.

=== Adjacent municipalities ===
- Newington (north)
- Portsmouth (east)
- Rye (southeast)
- North Hampton (south)
- Stratham (west)
- Newmarket (northwest)

=== Climate ===
Climate data for Greenland, New Hampshire (1991–2020 normals, extremes 1973–present)
Month	Jan	Feb	Mar	Apr	May	Jun	Jul	Aug	Sep	Oct	Nov	Dec	Year
Record high °F (°C)	71 (22)	75 (24)	89 (32)	94 (34)	94 (34)	97 (36)	102 (39)	104 (40)	96 (36)	87 (31)	78 (26)	75 (24)	104 (40)
Mean maximum °F (°C)	55.3 (12.9)	56.8 (13.8)	66.0 (18.9)	81.2 (27.3)	88.1 (31.2)	91.3 (32.9)	93.6 (34.2)	92.0 (33.3)	88.3 (31.3)	78.4 (25.8)	68.9 (20.5)	57.8 (14.3)	95.3 (35.2)
Mean daily maximum °F (°C)	32.6 (0.3)	35.6 (2.0)	43.3 (6.3)	55.8 (13.2)	66.1 (18.9)	75.0 (23.9)	80.5 (26.9)	79.8 (26.6)	71.8 (22.1)	59.7 (15.4)	48.1 (8.9)	37.8 (3.2)	57.2 (14.0)
Daily mean °F (°C)	24.4 (−4.2)	26.6 (−3.0)	34.3 (1.3)	45.3 (7.4)	55.4 (13.0)	64.5 (18.1)	70.3 (21.3)	69.1 (20.6)	61.7 (16.5)	50.1 (10.1)	39.7 (4.3)	30.0 (−1.1)	47.6 (8.7)
Mean daily minimum °F (°C)	16.3 (−8.7)	17.6 (−8.0)	25.3 (−3.7)	34.8 (1.6)	44.8 (7.1)	54.1 (12.3)	60.1 (15.6)	58.8 (14.9)	51.7 (10.9)	40.5 (4.7)	31.2 (−0.4)	22.3 (−5.4)	38.1 (3.4)
Mean minimum °F (°C)	−4.2 (−20.1)	−1.2 (−18.4)	6.4 (−14.2)	22.7 (−5.2)	31.1 (−0.5)	41.2 (5.1)	49.4 (9.7)	47.5 (8.6)	35.4 (1.9)	26.4 (−3.1)	16.1 (−8.8)	4.8 (−15.1)	−6.9 (−21.6)
Record low °F (°C)	−26 (−32)	−15 (−26)	−6 (−21)	13 (−11)	15 (−9)	33 (1)	38 (3)	33 (1)	23 (−5)	17 (−8)	−6 (−21)	−17 (−27)	−26 (−32)
Average precipitation inches (mm)	3.63 (92)	3.57 (91)	4.77 (121)	4.56 (116)	3.95 (100)	4.59 (117)	3.89 (99)	3.66 (93)	4.08 (104)	4.95 (126)	4.12 (105)	4.88 (124)	50.65 (1,288)
Average snowfall inches (cm)	17.1 (43)	15.8 (40)	13.9 (35)	2.3 (5.8)	0.0 (0.0)	0.0 (0.0)	0.0 (0.0)	0.0 (0.0)	0.0 (0.0)	0.1 (0.25)	1.6 (4.1)	14.2 (36)	65.0 (165)
Average extreme snow depth inches (cm)	11.0 (28)	12.5 (32)	11.2 (28)	2.1 (5.3)	0.0 (0.0)	0.0 (0.0)	0.0 (0.0)	0.0 (0.0)	0.0 (0.0)	0.0 (0.0)	0.8 (2.0)	8.5 (22)	18.7 (47)
Average precipitation days (≥ 0.01 in)	10.6	9.3	10.9	11.1	11.3	11.3	10.7	8.7	9.1	10.6	10.9	11.3	125.8
Average snowy days (≥ 0.1 in)	6.9	5.9	4.6	0.9	0.0	0.0	0.0	0.0	0.0	0.0	1.0	5.3	24.6
Source 1: NOAA
Source 2: National Weather Service

== Demographics ==
Historical population
Census	Pop.	Note	%±
1790	634		—
1800	548		−13.6%
1810	592		8.0%
1820	634		7.1%
1830	680		7.3%
1840	726		6.8%
1850	730		0.6%
1860	762		4.4%
1870	695		−8.8%
1880	695		0.0%
1890	647		−6.9%
1900	607		−6.2%
1910	575		−5.3%
1920	623		8.3%
1930	577		−7.4%
1940	695		20.5%
1950	719		3.5%
1960	1,196		66.3%
1970	1,784		49.2%
1980	2,124		19.1%
1990	2,768		30.3%
2000	3,208		15.9%
2010	3,549		10.6%
2020	4,067		14.6%
Historical Census Data

As of the census of 2000, there were 3,208 people, 1,204 households, and 892 families residing in the town. The population density was 305.9 inhabitants per square mile (118.1/km^{2}). There were 1,244 housing units at an average density of 118.6 per square mile (45.8/km^{2}). The racial makeup of the town was 97.79% White, 0.28% African American, 0.03% Native American, 1.22% Asian, 0.03% Pacific Islander, 0.12% from other races, and 0.53% from two or more races. Hispanic or Latino of any race were 0.72% of the population.

There were 1,204 households, out of which 36.2% had children under the age of 18 living with them, 62.5% were married couples living together, 8.1% had a female householder with no husband present, and 25.9% were non-families. 19.2% of all households were made up of individuals, and 6.4% had someone living alone who was 65 years of age or older. The average household size was 2.65 and the average family size was 3.07.

In the town, the population was spread out, with 26.5% under the age of 18, 4.4% from 18 to 24, 32.9% from 25 to 44, 26.2% from 45 to 64, and 10.1% who were 65 years of age or older. The median age was 38 years. For every 100 females, there were 92.1 males. For every 100 females age 18 and over, there were 89.5 males.

The median income for a household in the town was $62,172, and the median income for a family was $67,188. Males had a median income of $44,592 versus $31,815 for females. The per capita income for the town was $31,270. About 3.6% of families and 5.9% of the population were below the poverty line, including 10.1% of those under age 18 and 5.7% of those age 65 or over.

== Notable people ==
- Oney Judge (1773–1848), fugitive slave from the household of George Washington
- John F. Richards (1938–2007), historian of South Asia specializing in the Mughal Empire
- Benjamin F. Whidden (1813–1896), first U.S. ambassador to Haiti
