= Eliphalet Daniels =

American military commander (b. 1713, d. 1799)

- Born: September 13, 1713; Durham, New Hampshire, British Colonial America
- Died: July 1799; Durham, New Hampshire, United States
- Other names: Eliphalet Daniel
- Known for: Commander in the New Hampshire Militia, Continental Army officer for the United Colonies
- Spouses: Abigail Whiston, Sarah Gerrish
- Children: 11

Eliphalet Daniels (September 13, 1713 – July 1799) was a British Colonial America-born military leader. He served as a commander in the New Hampshire Militia of Fort Sullivan in Kittery, now Maine. Daniels also served as an officer under Timothy Bedel's Regiment of Continentals. In August 1776 he offered a two dollar reward for a drummer who went AWOL from his post.

== History ==
Eliphalet Daniels was born on September 13, 1713, in Durham, New Hampshire, British Colonial America.

In 1747 he appealed for government relief from the governor of the Province of New Hampshire after being wounded and imprisoned. He had been a lieutenant in the Canada expedition of 1746 when he was wounded and captured.

During the Revolutionary War in 1776, he commanded militia artillery troops at Fort Sullivan, succeeding Colonel Joshua Wingate in the role. Daniels was across from Titus Salter's command at Fort Washington on Peirce Island. Daniels had one lieutenant and twenty-five artillerists at Fort Sullivan, under his lead.

There are conflicting records of death for Daniels, some state he died on July 29, 1799, and other records state he died on July 23, 1799.

== Heirs ==
Daniels was married twice, first to Abigail Whiston, and second to Sarah Gerrish. He had eleven children, two of which were from his second marriage. His son Eliphalet Daniels was born in 1737 to Daniels and his first wife Abigail Whiston.

Another Eliphalet Daniels (born April 12, 1797), fathered Eliphalet Daniels (born August 21, 1832) - may have been his grandson, or a later descendant.
