= Peirce Island =

Coordinates: 43°4′28″N 70°44′39″W

Peirce Island is a historic 27-acre (11 ha) island owned by the city of Portsmouth, New Hampshire, and is connected to adjacent outlying Four Tree Island. It is connected to the mainland by the Peirce Island bridge. The islands are open to the public and have views of salt marsh, tidal pools, rocky cliffs, and meadows as well as the Portsmouth Naval Shipyard, the South End, three bridges over the Piscataqua River, the "back channel", and a small island toward New Castle, New Hampshire. There is also an outdoor pool, walking paths, playgrounds, and boat launch area.

There is a sewer treatment plant on the island. Public amenities include parking, a public boat ramp, walking paths, historical markers, rest room on Four Tree Island only, public pool for summer use, and a small playground.

The island is located past the historic Point of Graves Burial Ground over the Peirce Island bridge. Fort Washington was located on the island. More recently, the area was known as a meeting place for gay paramours. Fort Washington and Fort Sullivan were built in 1775 and were named for George Washington and local war hero John Sullivan. Fort Washington was a star-shaped earthwork. Both forts were commanded by Captain Titus Salter (or Salten) during the American Revolution. They were re-garrisoned in the War of 1812 and abandoned after that war.

The islands were dog friendly until 2016.

== See also ==
- Prescott Park (New Hampshire), nearby
- Harbor Defenses of Portsmouth
