= Gay Bride of Frankenstein =

Gay Bride of Frankenstein is an American comic-book rock musical written by Dane Leeman and Billy Butler, with music and lyrics by Billy Butler. The concept album was created by Billy Butler and the Monster Makers during the 2008 RPM Challenge and premiered live on stage at the Players' Ring Theatre in Portsmouth, New Hampshire, that same year. It was a top selection in the 2009 New York Musical Theatre Festival, opening September 28 and closing October 11, and played seven sold-out performances at the TBG Theater in New York City. It then played at Seacoast Repertory Theatre in 2010 and two concerts at Joe's Pub in 2011. The comic book is drawn by Katie Drew.

== The Monster Makers ==
The Monster Makers is the band that was formed while writing the music for the show. The original line up featured Tim McCoy on bass, Jon McCormack on guitar, Jamie Perkins on drums and Billy Butler on piano, keys and vocals. The band actually feature in the show, much like the urchins from Little Shop of Horrors.
