= Port City Makerspace =

Port City Makerspace is a makerspace in Portsmouth, New Hampshire. It has been running since 2012, when it was first founded by a group of three graduates from Green Mountain College. Today it is a non-profit with 8,000 square feet (740 m^{2}) of space dedicated to wood-working, welding, electronics work, textile arts, and automotive and bicycle repair. Port City Makerspace also hosts classes in topics such as laser cutting, machine embroidery, 3D-printing, woodworking, wood turning, and sewing.

== Membership ==
Membership at Port City Makerspace can either be a monthly membership or a pass for a day. There is no application to become a member. New members of the space do have to go through a "safety checkout" process before they are allowed to use some of the dangerous power tools.

== Community participation ==
Members and staff of Port City Makerspaces have contributed projects to the community around Portsmouth, including the Prescott Park Green Room, a mobile trailer for performers at the Prescott Park Arts Festival.

== Media coverage ==
- Featured on New Hampshire Chronicle - January 17th, 2013
- Feature about soldering class on the SparkFun Education Blog - February 12, 2015
- Secoast Online - January 14, 2014
- Union Leader - September 10, 2013
