= Winnicut River =

- Location within New Hampshire Location within the United States

Location
- Country: United States
- State: New Hampshire
- County: Rockingham
- Towns: North Hampton, Stratham, Greenland

Physical characteristics
- Source: Line Swamp
  - location: North Hampton
  - coordinates: 42°58′13″N 70°51′31″W
  - elevation: 50 ft (15 m)
- Mouth: Great Bay
  - location: Bath
  - coordinates: 43°2′53″N 70°50′28″W
  - elevation: 0 ft (0 m)
- Length: 9.1 mi (14.6 km)

Basin features
- Tributaries
  - left: Marsh Brook, Winniconic Brook, Thompson Brook
  - right: Cornelius Brook, Barton Brook, Norton Brook, Packer Brook

The Winnicut River is a 9.1-mile-long (14.6 km) river in the Seacoast region of New Hampshire in the United States. A small river, it is nonetheless the major southeastern tributary of Great Bay, an estuary connected by way of the tidal Piscataqua River to the Atlantic Ocean.

The Winnicut River rises at the northern outlet of Line Swamp in the town of North Hampton, New Hampshire, just west of Interstate 95. The river flows north through gently rolling fields and scattered suburban development, eventually entering the town of Greenland. It passes under New Hampshire Route 33 and becomes a tidal river for its remaining mile to Great Bay.

== See also ==
- List of rivers of New Hampshire
