= Little Bay Bridge =

Bridges in New Hampshire, US

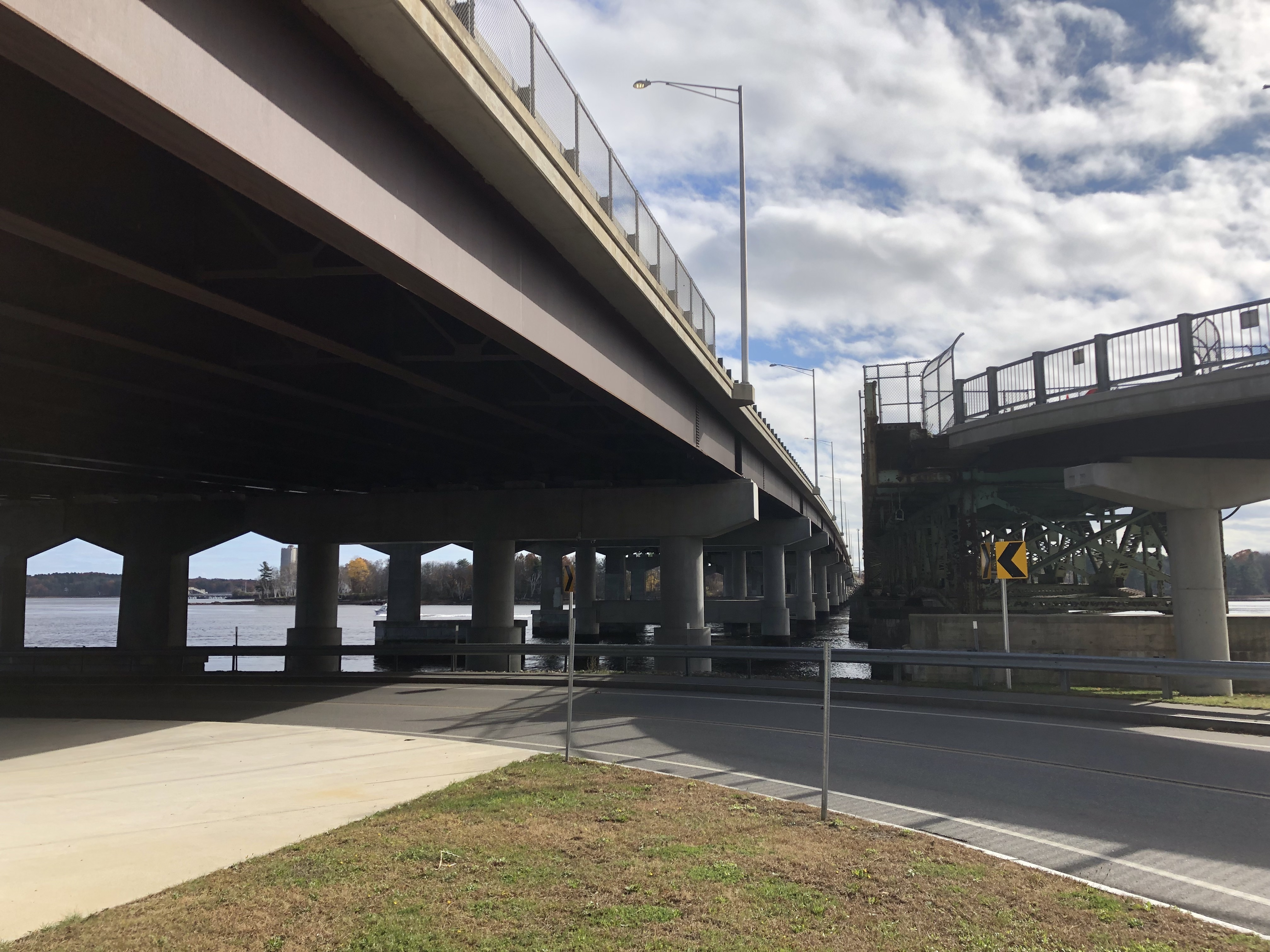
- View in November 2019 between the Ruth L. Griffin Bridge and General Sullivan Bridge, with underside of the 1984 Capt. John F. Rowe Bridge at the far left
- Coordinates: 43.1181°N 70.82559°W
- Carried: 7 lanes of US 4 / NH 16 / Spaulding Turnpike, pedestrians and bicycles on the Rowe Bridge
- Crossed: Piscataqua River
- Locale: Dover and Newington, New Hampshire, U.S.
- Official name: General Sullivan Bridge (closed); Capt. John F. Rowe Bridge; Ruth L. Griffin Bridge
- Maintained by: NHDOT
- ID number: 006502010002500 (Northbound) 006502010002400 (Southbound)

Characteristics
- Total length: 486.2 m (1,595 ft)
- Width: 8.5 m (27.9 ft) (each span)
- Clearance above: 6.93 m (22.7 ft)
- Clearance below: 14 m (45.9 ft)

History
- Opened: 1873 (Original); 1934 (Sullivan); September 28, 1966 (Rowe northbound, southbound from 1984–2018); 1984 (Rowe bridge); 2013 (Griffin)
- Rebuilt: 2013–2018 (Rowe bridges)
- Closed: 1934 (original bridge); 1984 (Sullivan Bridge; to vehicles); 2018 (Sullivan Bridge; all uses)
- Demolished: 2026–ongoing (Sullivan Bridge)

Statistics
- Daily traffic: 67,673 (2015)
- Toll: Former (Note: The Spaulding Turnpike is a tolled road; its Dover toll booth is located approximately 1.5 miles (2.4 km) north of the bridges. U.S. Route 4 is toll-free.)

Location
- Interactive map of Little Bay Bridge

The Little Bay Bridge (occasionally referred to in the plural) is any of the bridges that carry road traffic across the mouth of Little Bay where it meets the Piscataqua River, between the city of Dover and the town of Newington in New Hampshire. The term has been in use since at least 1933.

Currently, a pair of four-lane girder bridges carry a concurrency of U.S. Route 4, NH Route 16, and the Spaulding Turnpike over the mouth of Little Bay. Since August 2019, the bridges carry seven motor vehicle lanes with four shoulders, and one non-motorized multi-use path.

== History ==
=== 19th century ===
The first Little Bay Bridge was a covered bridge that was made up of two spectate segments, one for wagons and mobile transportation, and one for railroad tracks. It opened to wagon traffic in December 1873 when partially completed, and began carrying rail traffic in February 1874 when it was fully completed. It was also a for profit toll bridge.

In 1888, the bridge was closed for repairs, the first of many it received.

=== 20th century ===
Circa 1918, rocks were placed on the bridge's piers after it had been discovered they suffered from ice-created scour.

In 1928, construction began on a replacement of the functionally obsolete and structurally challenged bridge. It was completed in 1934, and was dedicated that year on September 5. It was built approximately 100 yards (91 m) south of the 1874 bridge. It cost US$1 million to build ($24.1 million in 2025), and in early 1935 was named the "General John Sullivan Memorial Bridge" (commonly known as the General Sullivan Bridge) in honor of John Sullivan, a Revolutionary War general from nearby Somersworth. At this point, the original bridge was closed and slated for demolition, and after roughly 61 years of service, the original bridge was fully deconstructed by February 1935.

On November 1, 1949, the bridge's toll was removed, as the bonds that required them were fully paid off.

In 1950, significant repairs were made to the bridge.

When built through the area, the Spaulding Turnpike was routed over the bridge in 1956. However, a second span was to be built in the future. On September 28, 1966, the Eastern Turnpike Bridge, a two-lane girder bridge that cost US$3 million ($29.8 million in 2025), was opened. Upon its opening, the existing General Sullivan Bridge was converted to serving southbound traffic only; this doubled the capacity of the crossing from what it was prior.

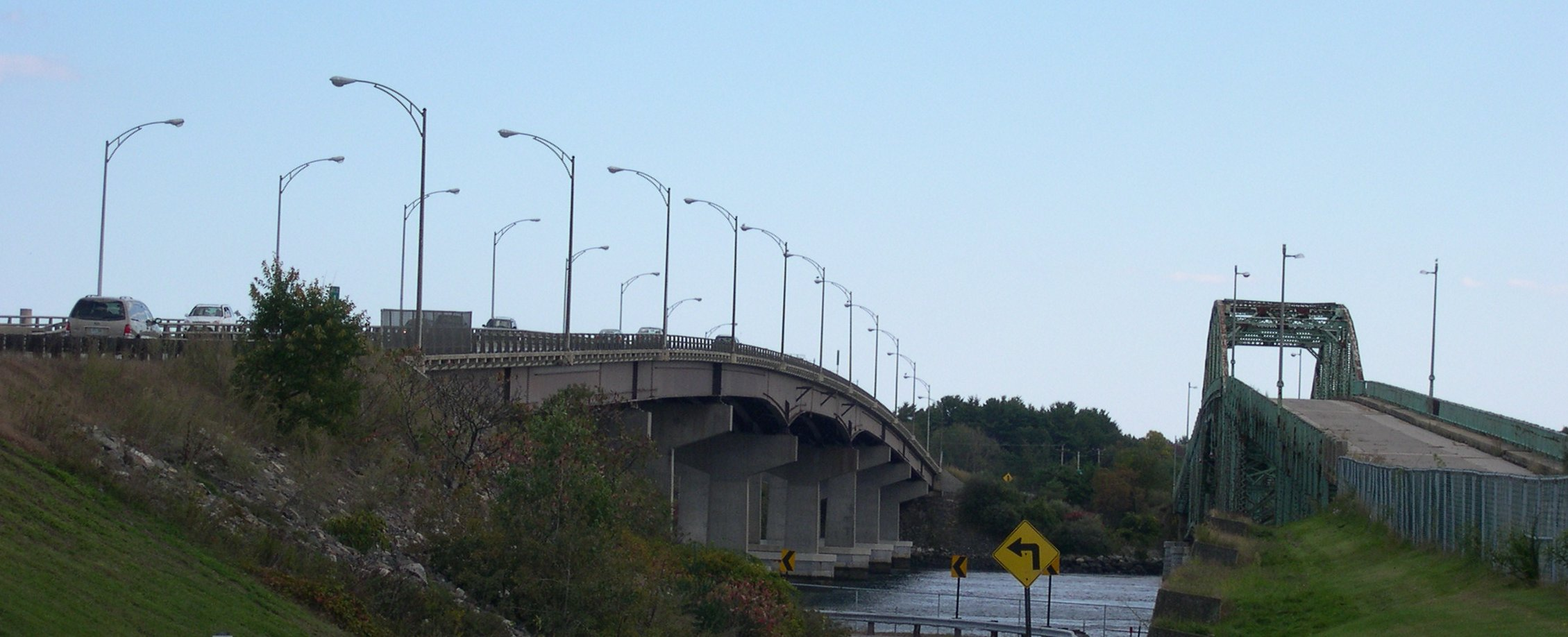
View looking south from Dover Point. From left; the 1984 and 1966 spans of the Capt. John F. Rowe Bridge, and the General Sullivan Bridge. Photo taken in 2006, prior to construction of the Ruth L. Griffin Bridge between the bridges shown.

In 1984, the Capt. John F. Rowe Bridge, named after merchant John Rowe, was completed. It was a new twin of the 1966 bridge, built to carry northbound traffic. Southbound traffic was moved onto the 1966 bridge, and the General Sullivan Bridge was repurposed as a pedestrian walkway; this made it a highly popular fishing spot in the area.

In 1988, the Sullivan bridge was deemed eligible for the National Register of Historic Places. Although unnamed, the General Sullivan Bridge appeared in a 1997 episode of WWF Monday Night Raw, when Steve Austin threw the WWE Intercontinental Championship belt (then belonging to The Rock) into the river below.

=== 21st century ===
In 2010, fencing was installed on the General Sullivan Bridge to warn pedestrians about a new capacity limit enacted onto specific areas, this was done due to concerns about the bridge's poor structural condition. That next year, the bridge was repaired, and the Dover approach was demoslhed and rebuitlt into a curved ramp to allow construction.

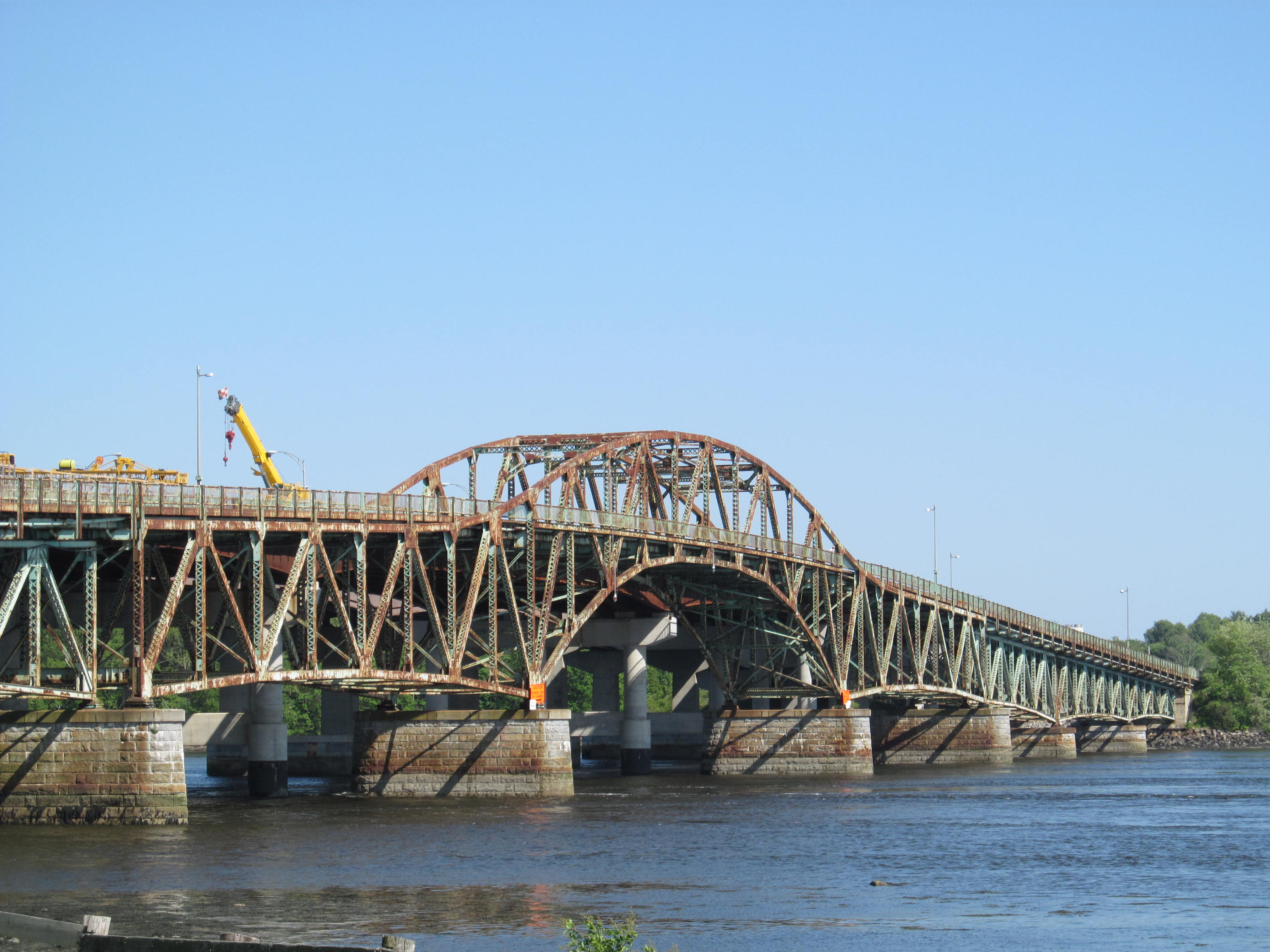
The General Sullivan Bridge in June 2013, with the Ruth L. Griffin Bridge under construction (yellow crane)

The Little Bay Bridge and its access roads on the Dover and Newington banks had been prone to traffic congestion during morning and afternoon rush hours. The New Hampshire DOT planned a comprehensive improvement of the area. All three bridges were under scrutiny, with four options considered. Three options called for expansion of the Little Bay Bridge to six or eight lanes and restoration of the General Sullivan as both a pedestrian/bicycle way and alternative for buses and overflow traffic. The fourth option would have replaced all three spans with an eight-lane bridge. Ultimately, constructing a new span was chosen. Work on a new bridge that would ease traffic congestion across the Rowe bridge began circa 2011, and was completed in November 2013. It was built between the original Rowe bridge and the General Sullivan Bridge. Once this new bridge was completed, all traffic from the Rowe bridge was moved to it, so both of the Rowe bridges could be closed for renovations and replacement of the divided decks with a unified road deck. Renovations were completed in November 2015, although the Rowe bridge remained closed for several years due to significant realignment work on the nearby U.S. Route 4 interchange. In June 2018, the 2013 bridge was officially named the Ruth L. Griffin Bridge, named for a 20-year member of the Executive Council of New Hampshire. Griffin died in August 2024, aged 99. Two lanes of northbound traffic returned to the newly rebuilt Rowe bridge in December 2018. The third northbound lane on the Rowe Bridge was opened on May 23, 2019. All four lanes of the Griffin bridge were opened to southbound traffic on July 20, 2019. A non-motorized multi-use path was opened on the northbound shoulder in August 2019. On April 21, 2020, a new lane pattern was established on the Griffin Bridge. A new merging pattern onto the Rowe bridge, better enabling traffic from U.S. Route 4 and the Spaulding Turnpike to utilize the four lanes, went into effect in April 2020. By June 2020, the project was substantially completed, with the shoulders and signage being finalized.

== General Sullivan Bridge removal ==
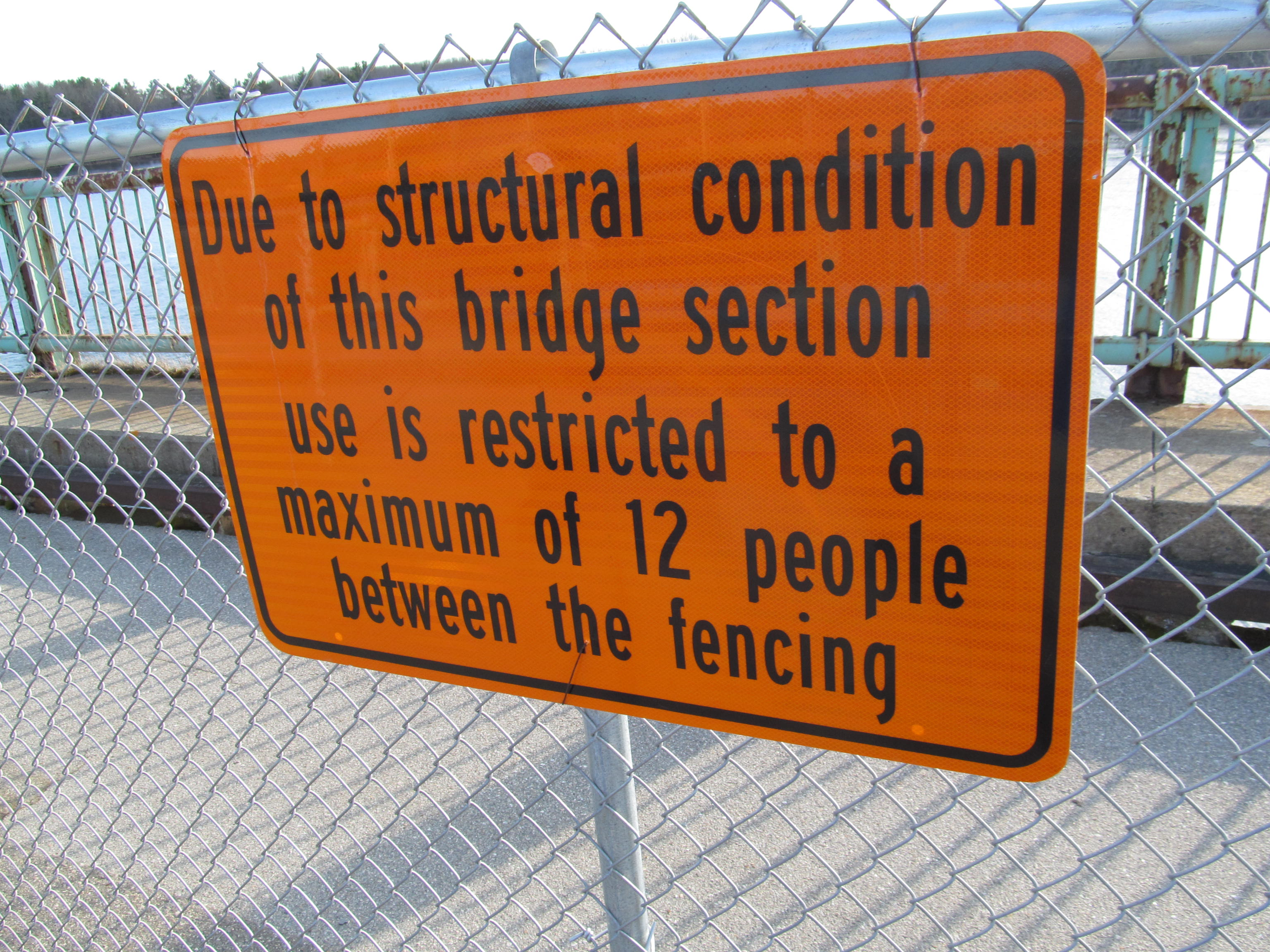
A warning sign on the General Sullivan Bridge, as seen in March 2013

While the General Sullivan Bridge was considered "nationally significant... as an early and highly influential example of continuous truss highway design in the United States", its future remained uncertain for an extended period. In 2015, the mid-section of the bridge was closed off due to worsening condition; this rendered the bridge functionally obsolete. In September 2018, the bridge was permanently closed for all uses, due to safety concerns that it was unsound. The Coast Guard regarded the bridge as a navigation hazard and favored its removal. Bridge proponents cited its eligibility for listing on the National Register of Historic Places. While the Rowe bridge was built to accommodate four lanes of northbound motorized traffic, its configuration during this period was limited to three lanes. This was to accommodate a non-motorized multi-use path, the removal of which could have been enabled by restoration or replacement of the General Sullivan Bridge, giving that effort additional relevance.

As of July 2018, restored pedestrian and bicycle access to the General Sullivan Bridge was planned for the summer of 2022. As of January 2020, "the state’s plan now is to build a new bridge on the existing piers". The new bridge was expected to be a 16-foot-wide (4.9 m) multi-use path. In February 2023, the New Hampshire Department of Transportation (NH DOT) estimated the cost of replacing the original bridge with a 9-foot-wide (2.7 m) bicycle and pedestrian walkway at $34.8 million, with a 2026 completion date. In June 2023, $20 million was allocated for the project from the federal Rebuilding American Infrastructure with Sustainability and Equity (RAISE) program. In August 2023, NH DOT put the General Sullivan Bridge up for sale, but did not receive any offers. In September 2023, bidding for the replacement project came in at over $80 million, potentially delaying efforts. In September 2024, it was reported that plans were in development for a less expensive bridge for pedestrians and bicycles.

In October 2025, the Executive Council of New Hampshire approved a contact worth $28.4 million to have the General Sullivan Bridge removed. In late December 2025, it was reported that removal was expected to start in March 2026. Removal of the bridge was reported as underway at the end of March 2026. As of August 2026, removal of the bridge was expected to last into 2027.

== Gallery ==
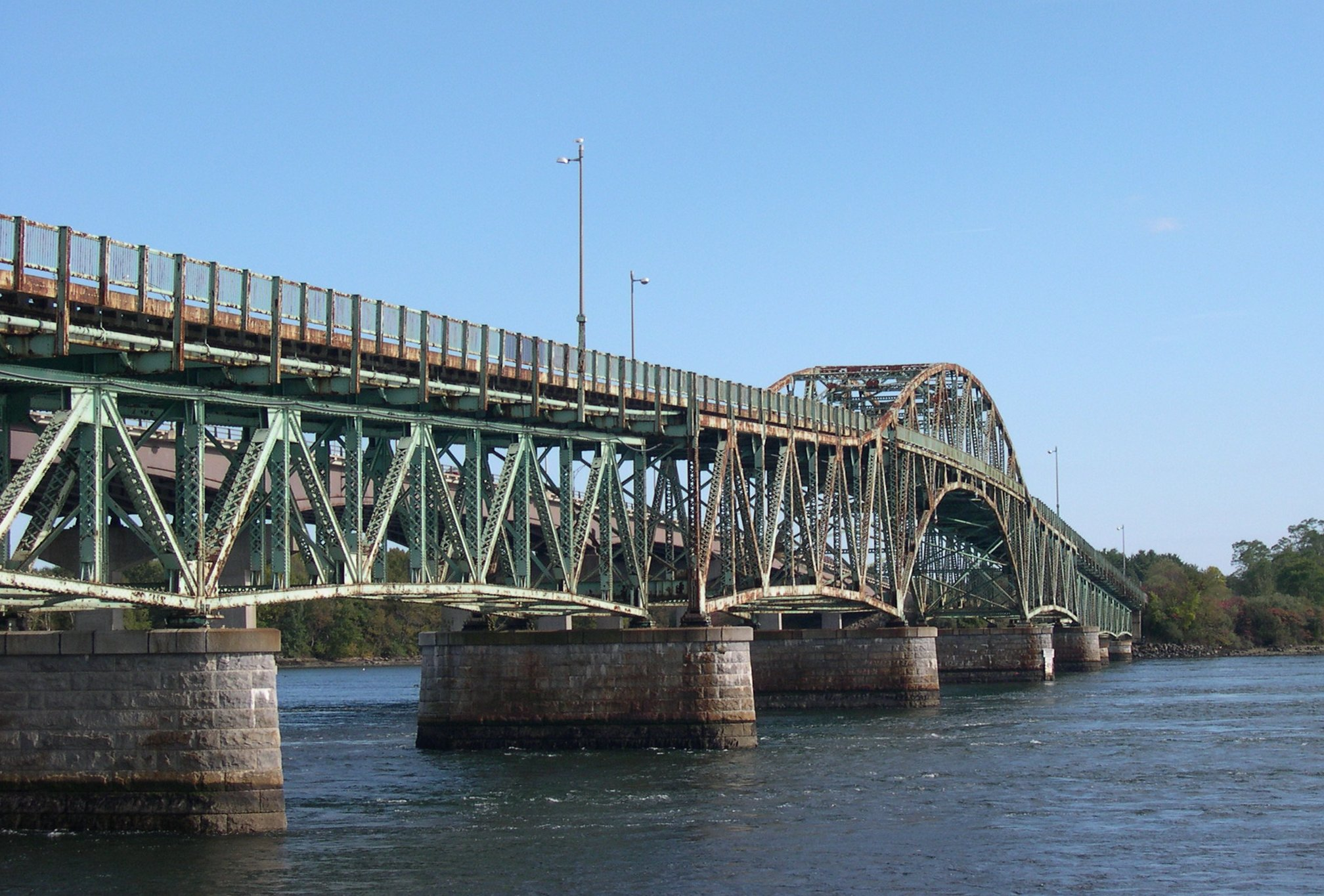
The Sullivan bridge as seen from Hilton Park on Dover Point

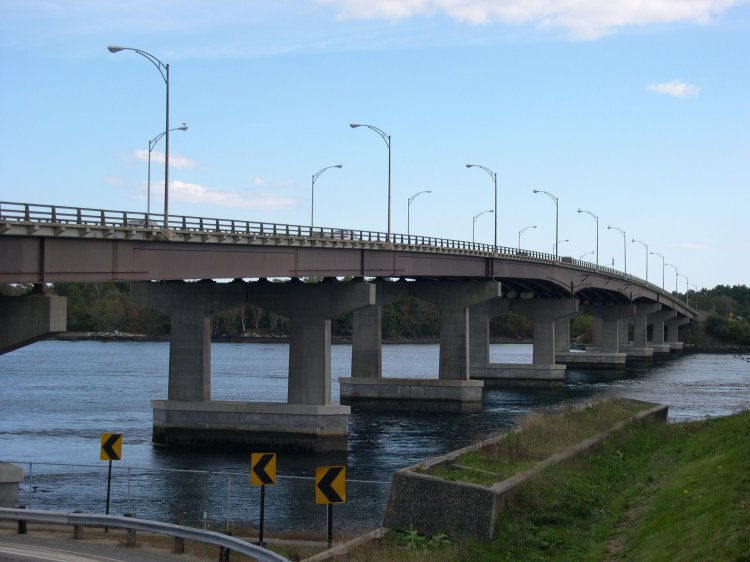
The Capt. John F. Rowe Bridge, prior to reconstruction

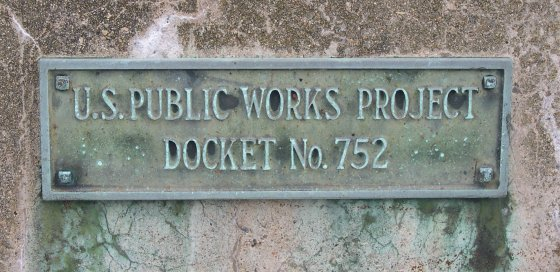
The Sullivan bridge's plaque, which reads "U.S. Public Works Project Docket No. 752"

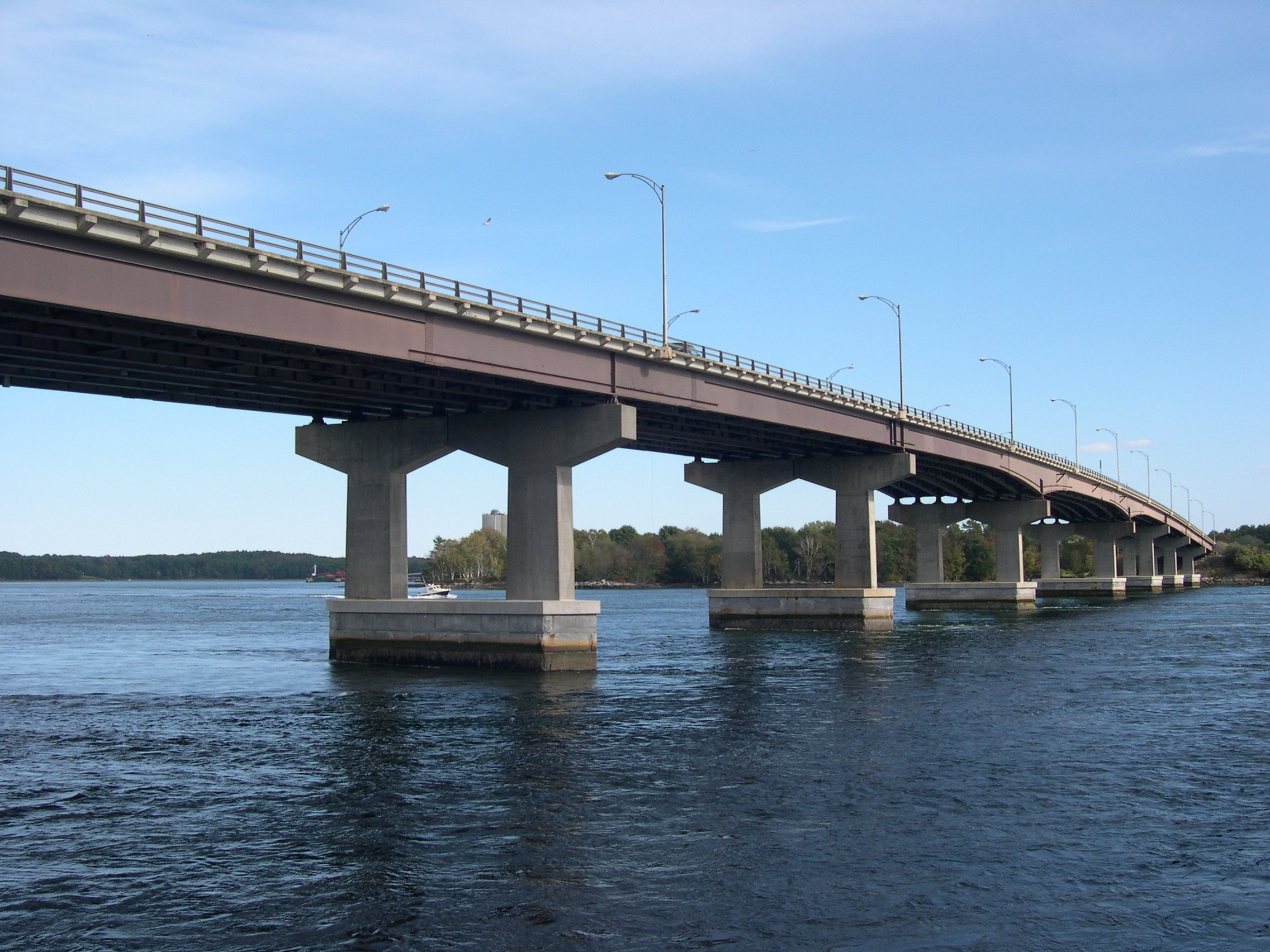
The Capt. John F. Rowe Bridge, prior to reconstruction

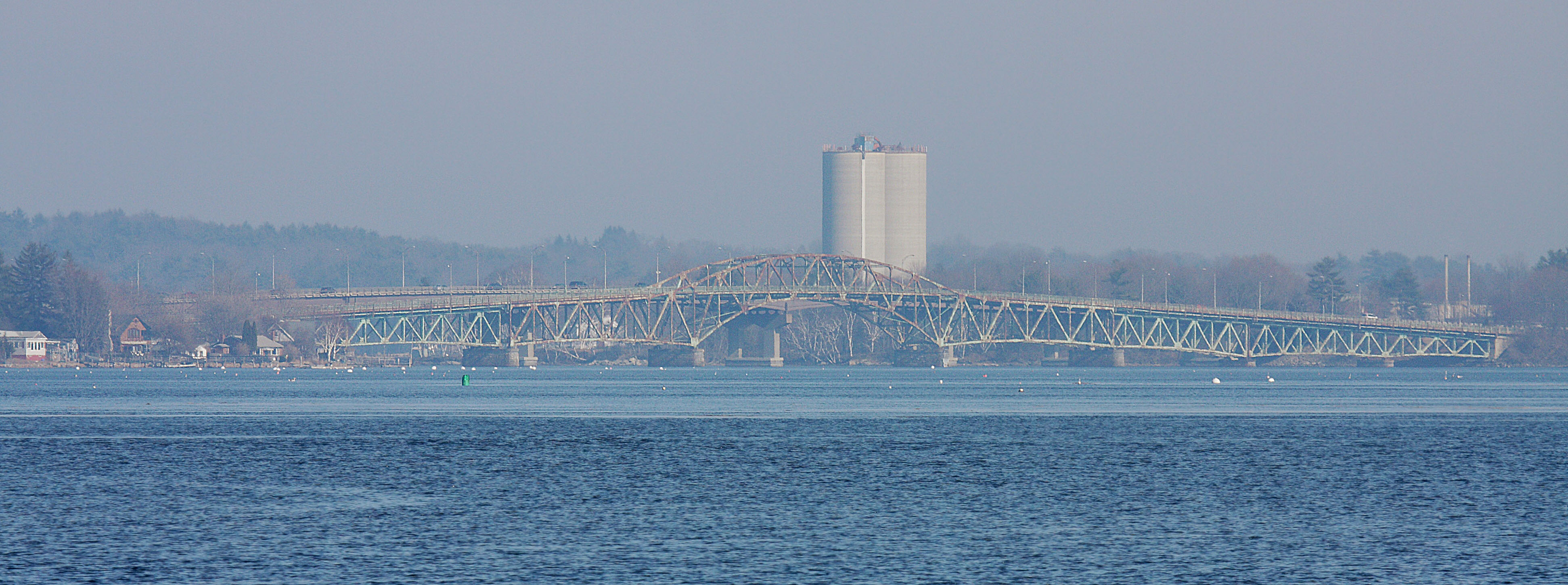
The Sullivan bridge, as seen from Wagon Hill Park in nearby Durham

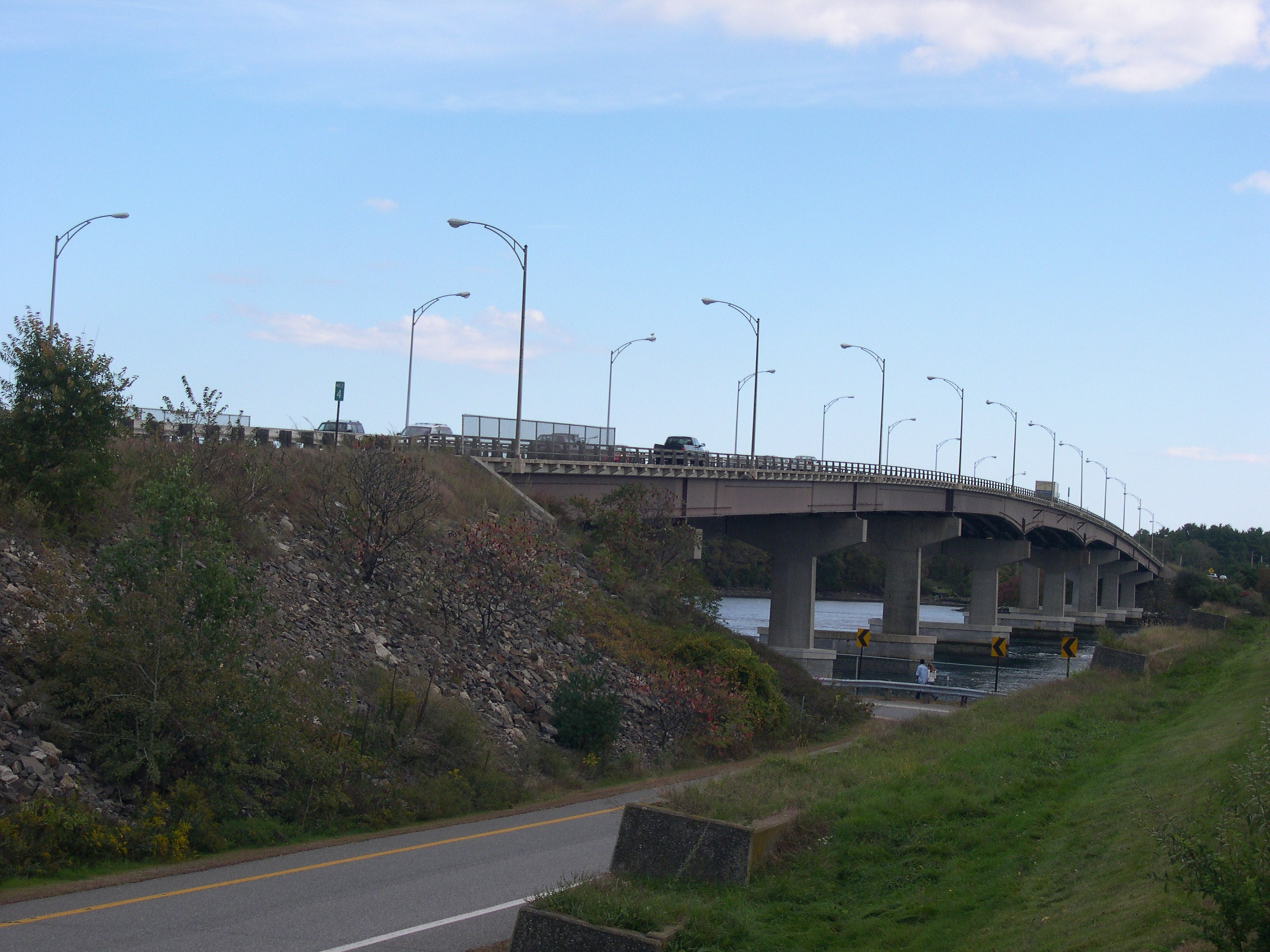
Dover abutment of the Rowe Bridge, prior to reconstruction

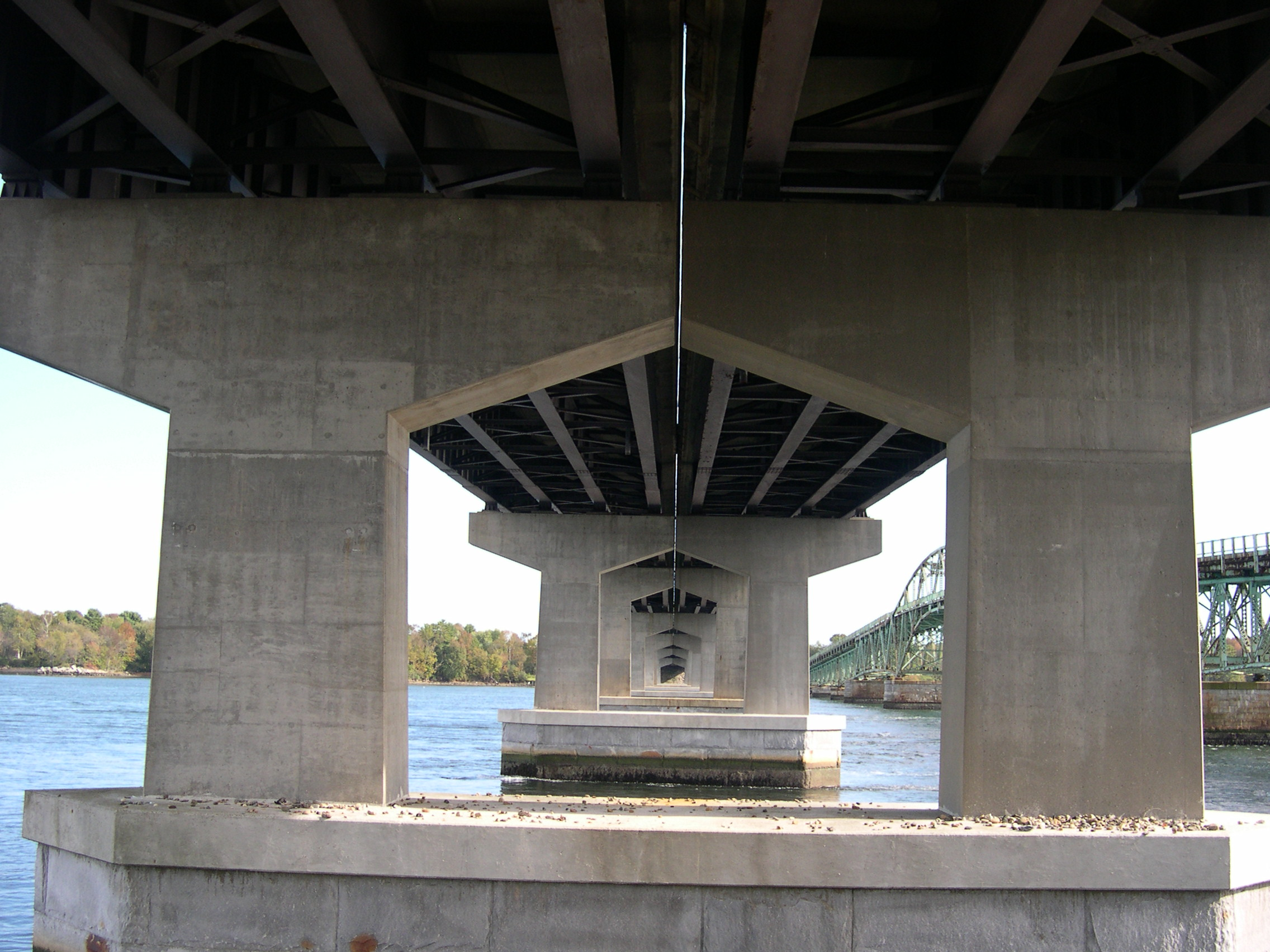
Underside of the Rowe bridge, showing the dual two-lane spans
