= Great Bay (New Hampshire) =

Tidal estuary in New Hampshire, United States

Coordinates: 43°04′01″N 70°52′07″W

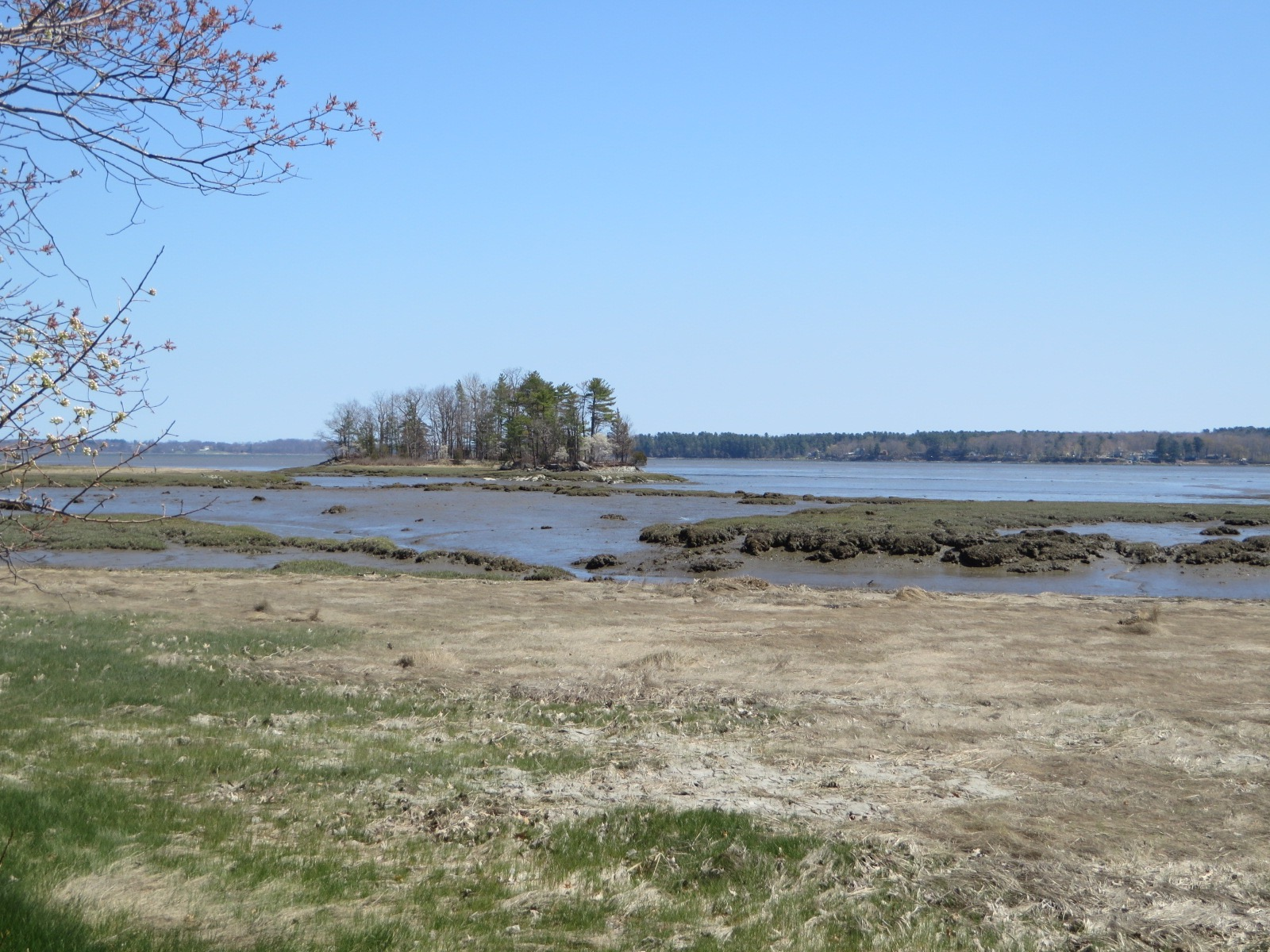
View of Great Bay from Lubberland Creek salt marsh on west side

Great Bay is a tidal estuary in southeastern New Hampshire, United States. It occupies over 6,000 acres (24 km^{2}), not including its several tidal river tributaries. Its outlet is at Hilton Point in Dover, where it joins the Piscataqua River, which flows southeast to the Atlantic Ocean near Portsmouth. Its northern end, near its outlet, is Little Bay.

== Geography ==
Located within the Gulf of Maine watershed, the Great Bay Estuary is a drowned river valley composed of high-energy tidal waters, deep channels and fringing mudflats. The entire estuary extends inland from the mouth of the Piscataqua River between Kittery, Maine, and New Castle, New Hampshire through Little Bay into Great Bay proper at Furber Strait, a distance of 12 miles (19 km). The Great Bay Estuary is a tidally-dominated system and is the drainage confluence of three major rivers, the Lamprey, Squamscott, and Winnicut. Four additional rivers flow into the system between Furber Strait and the open coast: the Cocheco, Salmon Falls, Bellamy, and Oyster rivers.

The Piscataqua River is an ocean-dominated system extending from the Gulf of Maine at Portsmouth Harbor and forming the border of New Hampshire and Maine to the fork of its tributaries, the Salmon Falls and Cocheco rivers. These rivers, several small creeks and their tributaries and ocean water from the Gulf of Maine create the Great Bay estuarine hydrosystem. The tidal range is dramatic within Great Bay. Average depth of the embayment is 2.7 meters (8.9 ft) with channels extending to 17.7 m (58 ft). The water surface of Great Bay covers 8.9 square miles (23 km^{2}) at high tide and 4.2 square miles (11 km^{2}) at low tide, leaving greater than 50% of the bay exposed at low tide.

== Natural heritage ==
The Great Bay Estuary, when counting the entire tidal system including the Piscataqua River, meets the Atlantic Ocean at the mouth of the Piscataqua, between New Castle, New Hampshire and Kittery, Maine. Tides carry salt water into the estuary twice daily from the Atlantic. Here it mingles with the fresh water influence from the various rivers that empty into Great Bay. At 10 miles (16 km) inland, it is one of the most recessed estuaries on the East coast of the U.S.

Approximately 14,000 years ago, following the melting of the glaciers, the Great Bay estuary was formed. The glacial melt waters contributed to rising ocean waters, which flooded the land and filled the river valleys that make up Great Bay today.

There are five very different water-dominated habitats that make up the Great Bay. In order of abundance they are: eelgrass meadows, mudflats, salt marsh, channel bottom, and rocky intertidal. These habitats are home to 162 bird, fish and plant species (23 of which are threatened or endangered), countless invertebrate species and even the occasional harbor seal.

Eelgrass is one of a very few underwater marine flowering plants. It has many functions in the estuarine system. The eelgrass community provides habitat for several organisms, especially the young of fish and invertebrates. Eelgrass roots help stabilize the bottom sediments. Eelgrass plants help maintain water quality and clarity by filtering the water allowing sediments to settle and then using the excess nutrients for growth.

More than half of Great Bay is exposed as mudflats at low tide. Worms, soft-shelled clams, mud snails, green crabs, wading birds, horseshoe crabs and many other animals utilize the extensive mudflat habitat for feeding, reproduction and protection from predators.

The channel bottom habitat provides a place for fish and invertebrates to move to at low tide. It is also the preferred habitat for oysters, a highly specialized animal that only lives in estuaries.

Rocky intertidal habitat provides firm anchorage for seaweeds, barnacles, and ribbed mussels. Each winter, much of the standing crop of seaweeds becomes entrapped in ice. When the ice begins to break up in spring, the seaweeds are torn from the rocks and enter into the detritus cycle.

== Cultural history ==
Native Americans were the first to live on the shores of Great Bay. They survived on the abundant fish, shellfish, waterfowl and mammals that lived in and around the estuary.

The early 17th century brought the arrival of European settlers who also took advantage of the seemingly endless supply of resources. They used the bay to transport their harvests. The tidal influence was the perfect way to move goods without much human or animal effort. A simple, flat-bottomed boat, the gundalow, was developed to make use of the tides and carry heavy loads in shallow waters.

Gundalows transported many types of freight. Saltmarsh hay, lumber, fish, clay and textiles were just a few of the cargoes. Salt hay harvested along the shores was used as food and bedding for horses and cattle. Sawmills located along the tidal rivers produced lumber that was exported to other U.S. ports. Core drilling shows evidence that the whole bay was once covered by several inches of sawdust from the dozens of sawmills around the bay's shores. The lumber produced also fueled the shipbuilding business along the Piscataqua River until steam-powered steel vessels became cheaper to build. Brickyards also dotted the shores of Great Bay and its tributaries. Blue marine clay was harvested from along the estuary shores and made into bricks that were used to build locally and all around New England. Cotton mills were an important part of the Industrial Revolution. Wherever gundalow ports were, mills were built.

The estuary continued to be heavily used for commercial purposes throughout the 19th and early 20th centuries. Gristmills and tanneries on the rivers of the estuary contributed significantly to the chemical pollution until the mid 20th century. When the Greek entrepreneur Aristotle Onassis proposed building the Olympic Oil Refinery in the town of Durham along the shore of Great Bay in 1973, local citizens mobilized and, by exercising their right to "home rule", defeated the proposal by a margin of nine to one.

== Regional significance ==
The Gulf of Maine, of which Great Bay is a branch, is one of the most pristine marine environments on the East Coast of the United States. As a result of its water circulation patterns and its seaweed, salt marsh grasses, and phytoplankton, it is also one of the world's most productive water bodies. Historically, it has been a source of livelihood for tens of thousands of commercial fishermen.

More recently, recreation- and tourism-related employment has become a major contributor to the region's economy.

== Protected areas ==
The Great Bay National Estuarine Research Reserve occupies several portions of the bay's shoreline and protects numerous land and water areas around the estuary, including salt marshes, rocky shores, bluffs, woodlands, open fields, and riverine systems and tidal waters.

The Great Bay National Wildlife Refuge, covering over 1,000 acres (400 ha) is on the eastern shore of Great Bay, in Newington. The Adams Point state Wildlife Management Area is a promontory in Durham, on the west side of Great Bay, separating Great and Little Bays. It covers 80 acres (32 ha), and is the site of the University of New Hampshire's Jackson Estuarine Laboratory. Other state Wildlife Management Areas around Great Bay include Glenn Cove in Greenland and Newington on the southeast, 129 acres (52 ha); Great Bay in Greenland, 82 acres (33 ha); Brackett Brook in Greenland on the south, 34 acres (14 ha); Squamscott River in Stratham on the southwest, 139 acres (56 ha); Shackford Poing in Newmarket to the west, 58 acres (23 ha); and Crommet Creek in Durham on the west, 657 acres (266 ha), but with very little directly adjacent to the Bay.

== See also ==
- Little Bay Bridge
