= Strawbery Banke =

Outdoor history museum in New Hampshire

- Strawbery Banke Historic District
- U.S. National Register of Historic Places
- U.S. Historic district
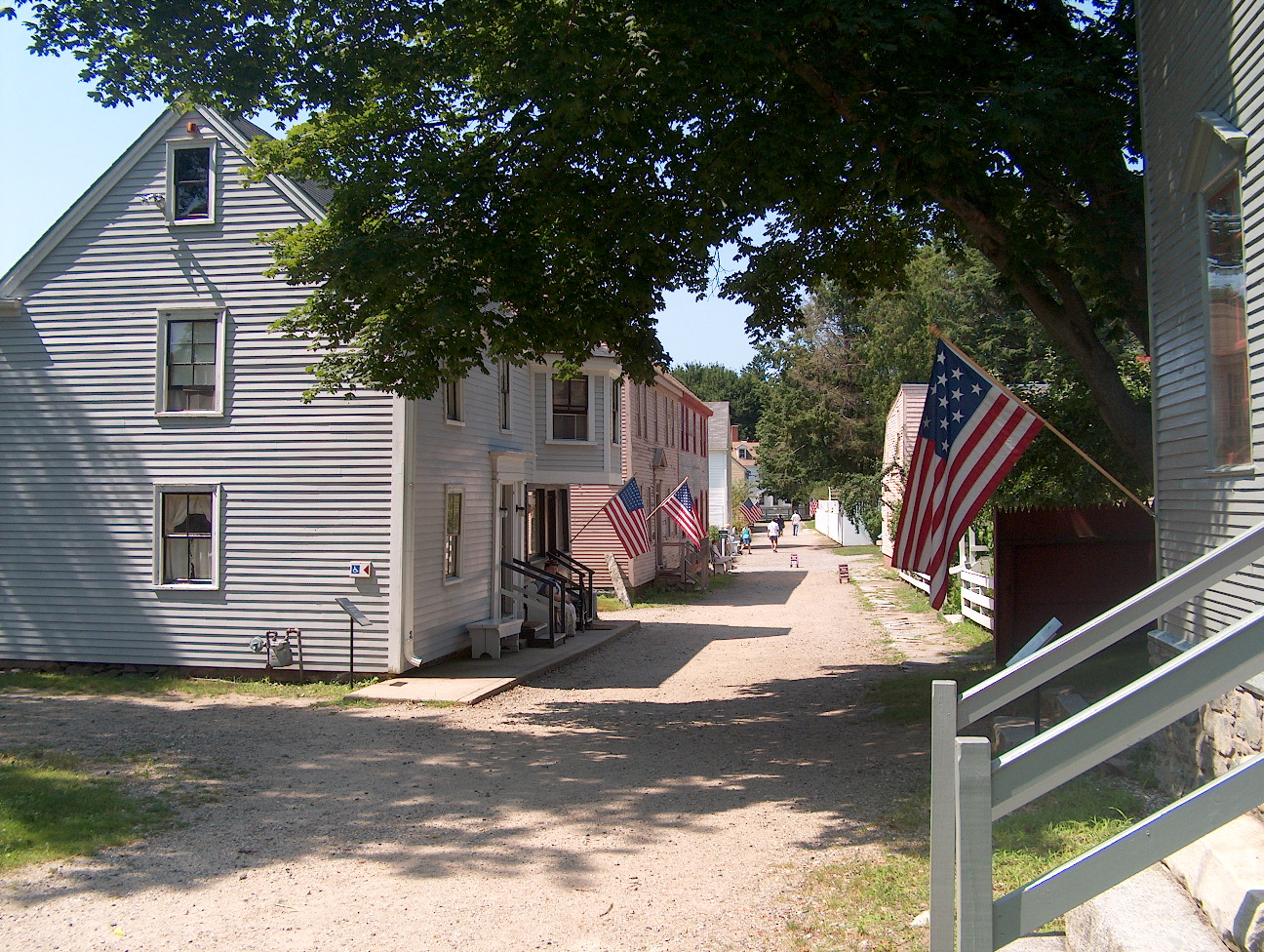
- Jefferson Street within the Strawbery Banke district

- Location within New Hampshire Location within the United States
- Location: Portsmouth, NH; Bounded by Court and Marcy Sts. and both sides of Hancock and Washington Sts.
- Coordinates: 43°04′34″N 70°45′12″W
- NRHP reference No.: 75000236
- Added to NRHP: June 20, 1975

Strawbery Banke is an outdoor history museum located in the South End historic district of Portsmouth, New Hampshire. It is the oldest neighborhood in New Hampshire to be settled by Europeans, and the earliest neighborhood remaining in the present-day city of Portsmouth. It features more than 37 restored buildings built between the 17th and 19th centuries in the Colonial, Georgian, and Federal style architectures. The buildings once clustered around a waterway known as Puddle Dock, which was filled in around 1900. Today the former waterway appears as a large open space.

== History ==
The neighborhood's history goes back to 1630, when Captain Walter Neale chose the area to build a settlement, naming it after the wild berries growing along the Piscataqua River. In 1631, Humphrey Chadborn constructed the Great House, marking the first permanent English building in the neighborhood. Subsequent housing and an influx of English ships led the tidal inlet port at Strawbery Banke to be known for its mercantile success. As the settlement grew, the neighborhood now encompassed by the Strawbery Banke Museum was named Puddle Dock in reference to the merchants' wharves. Several wealthy Portsmouth merchants resided close to their wharves, further drawing esteem to the area. Strawbery Banke existed as a neighborhood for a little over three centuries from 1630 to the late 1950s. By the end of the 19th century, the Puddle Dock neighborhood had lost its former esteem. Much of the earlier industrial activity had since been abandoned and left in place. The neighborhood's buildings were saved from 1950s urban renewal by the efforts of a large group of historic preservationists. Strawbery Banke opened as a museum in 1965.

== Education ==
Seventeen historic houses are open to the public as furnished historic interiors. Guests learn from staff interpreters the history and lifestyles of each house and how it reflects the social changes of its time period. In some houses, costumed roleplayers portray characters from time periods past. In others, historical interpreters educate visitors about the history. There are also five formal exhibits on archaeology, architecture, woodworking tools and skills, post-and-beam construction, and amusements and entertainment. Hearth cooking, weaving, basket weaving, and coopering demonstrations and tours are offered during a daily program season. Seasonal events are also held around major holidays.

Across the street from the museum are the riverside gardens and entertainments of Prescott Park.

Strawbery Banke was featured in Bob Vila's A&E Network production Guide to Historic Homes of America.

In August 2024, Strawbery Banke Museum became the first Smithsonian Affiliate in New Hampshire, joining the national network of the Smithsonian Institution and gaining access to collaborative exhibitions, educational programming, and institutional resources.

== Photo gallery ==
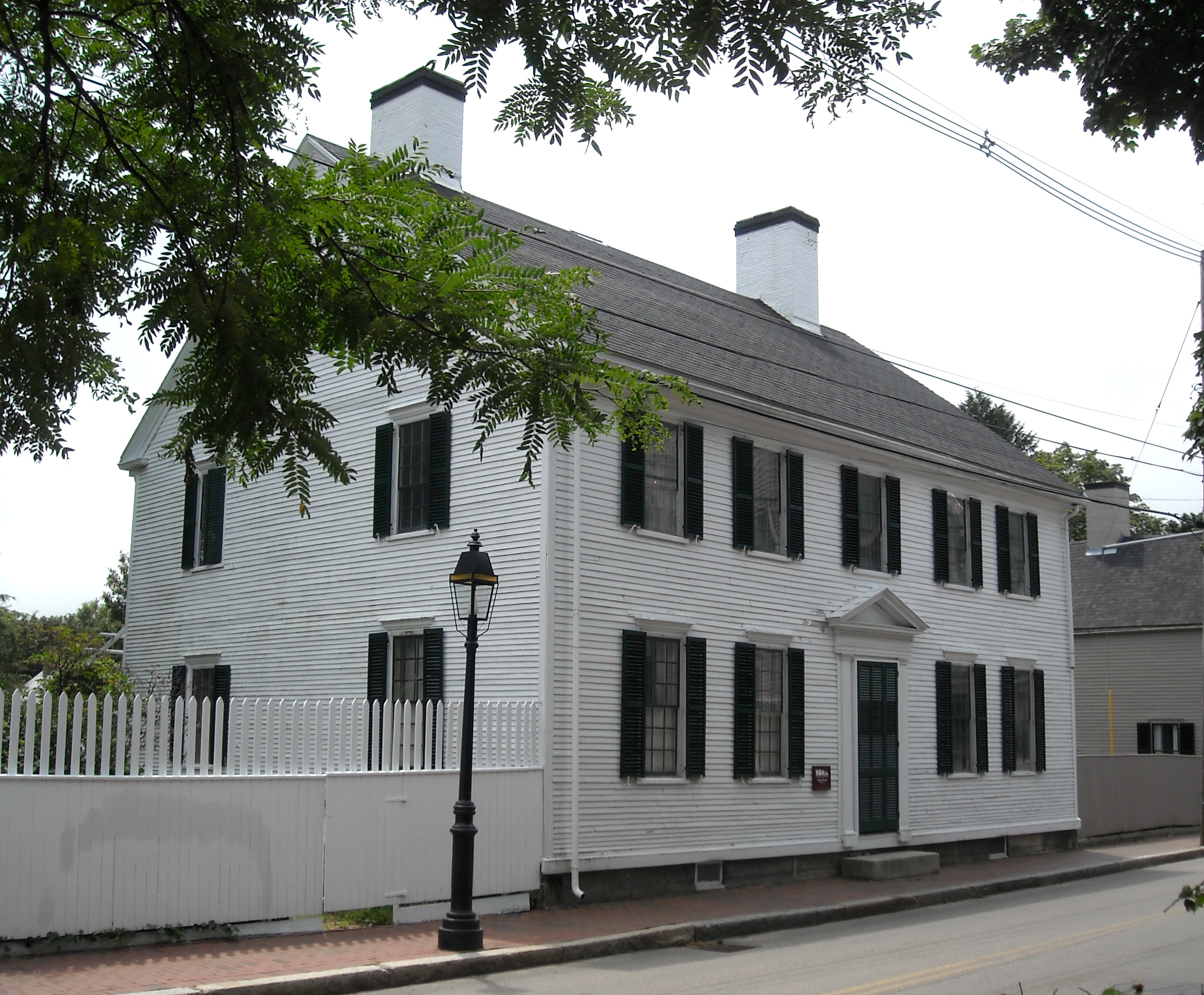
The Bailey House

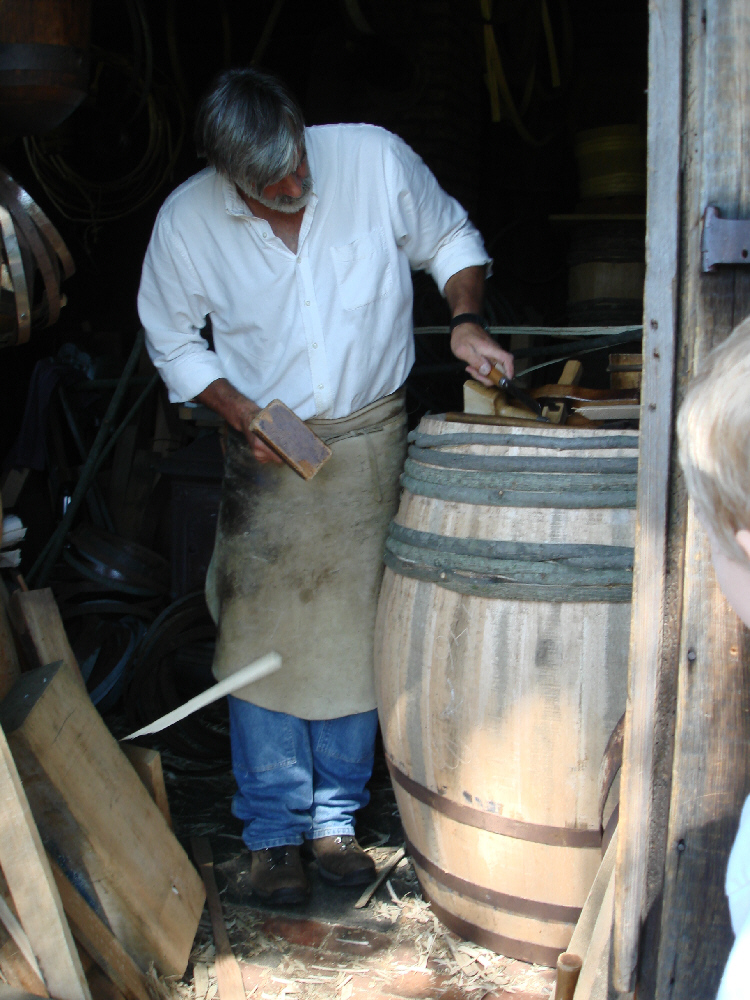
A cooper at work

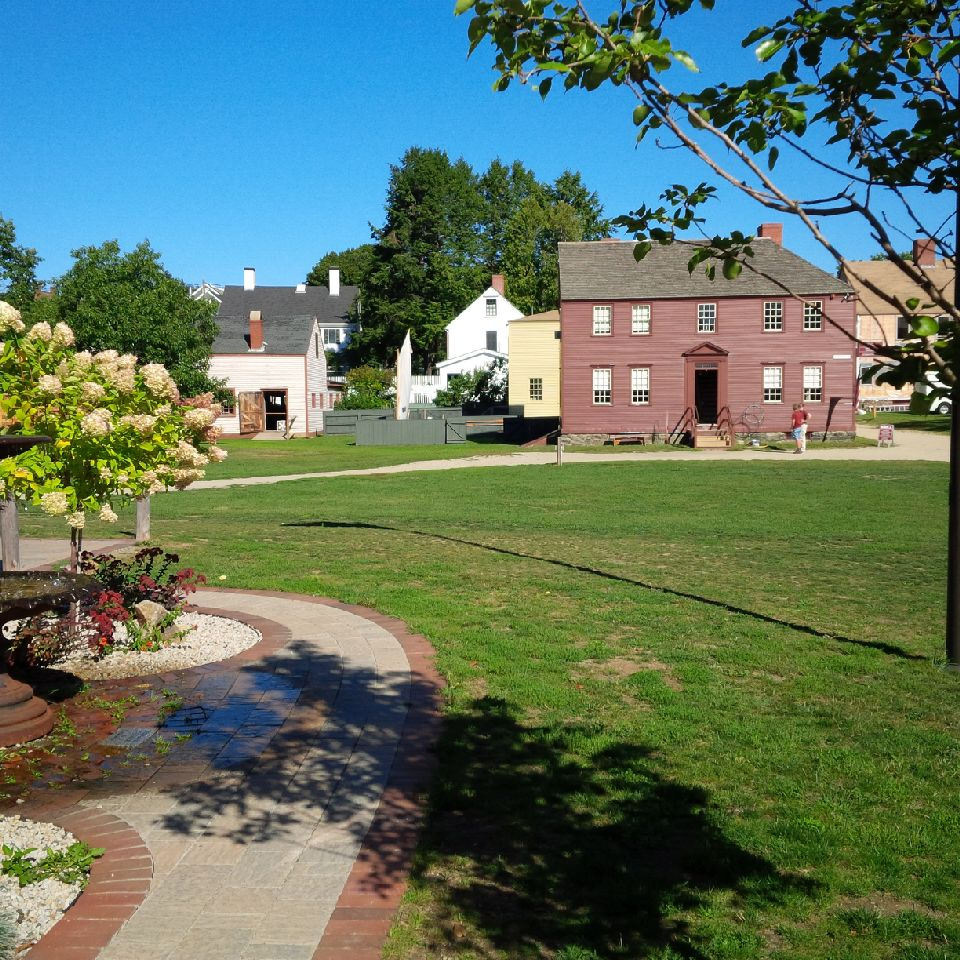
Strawbery Banke entrance

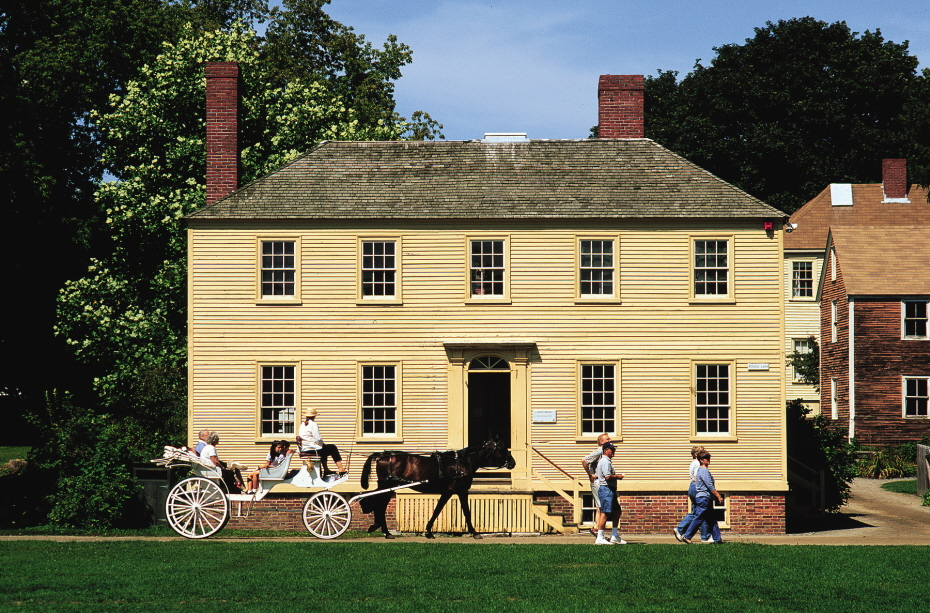
Lowd House

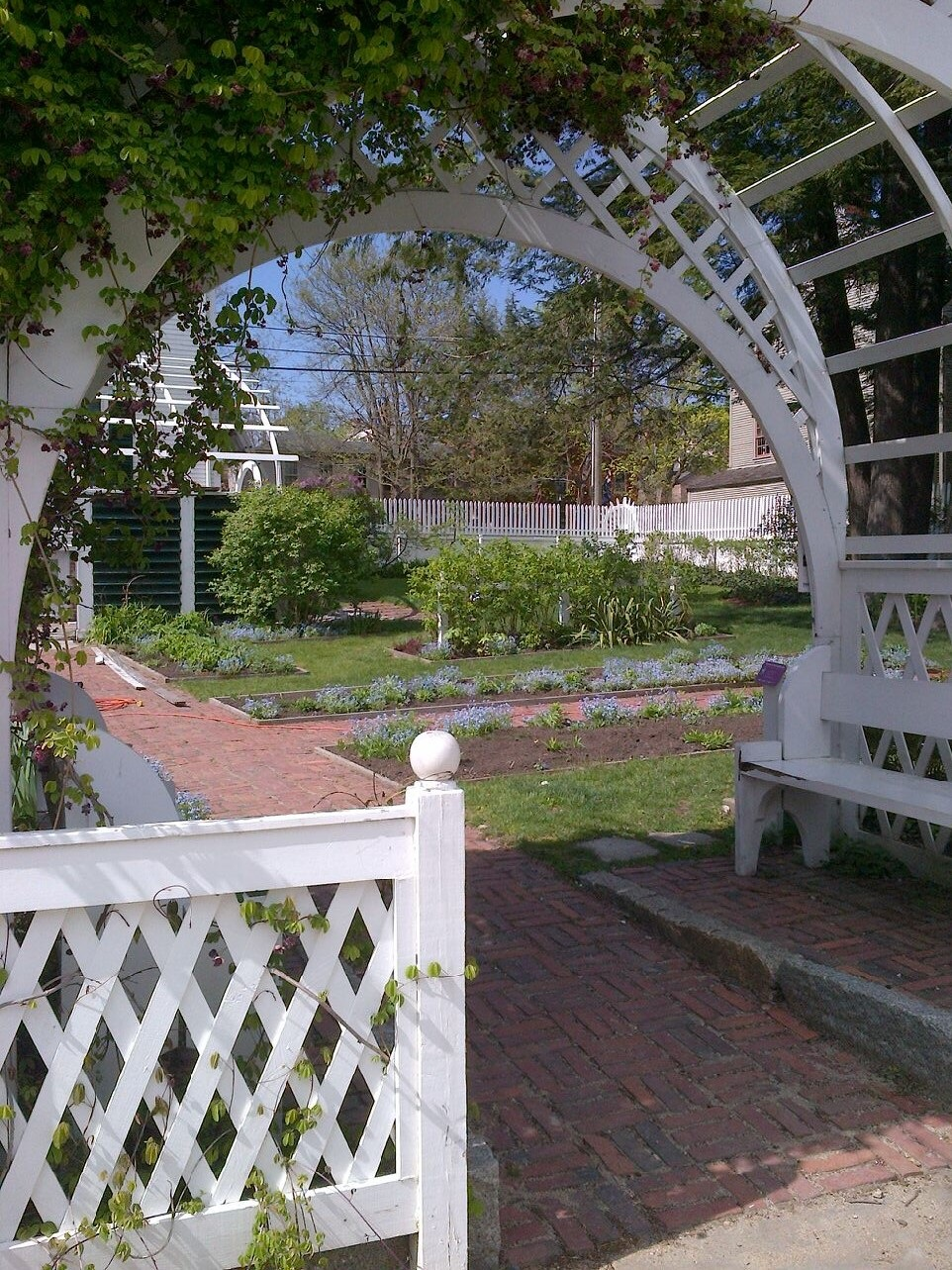
Aldrich Garden

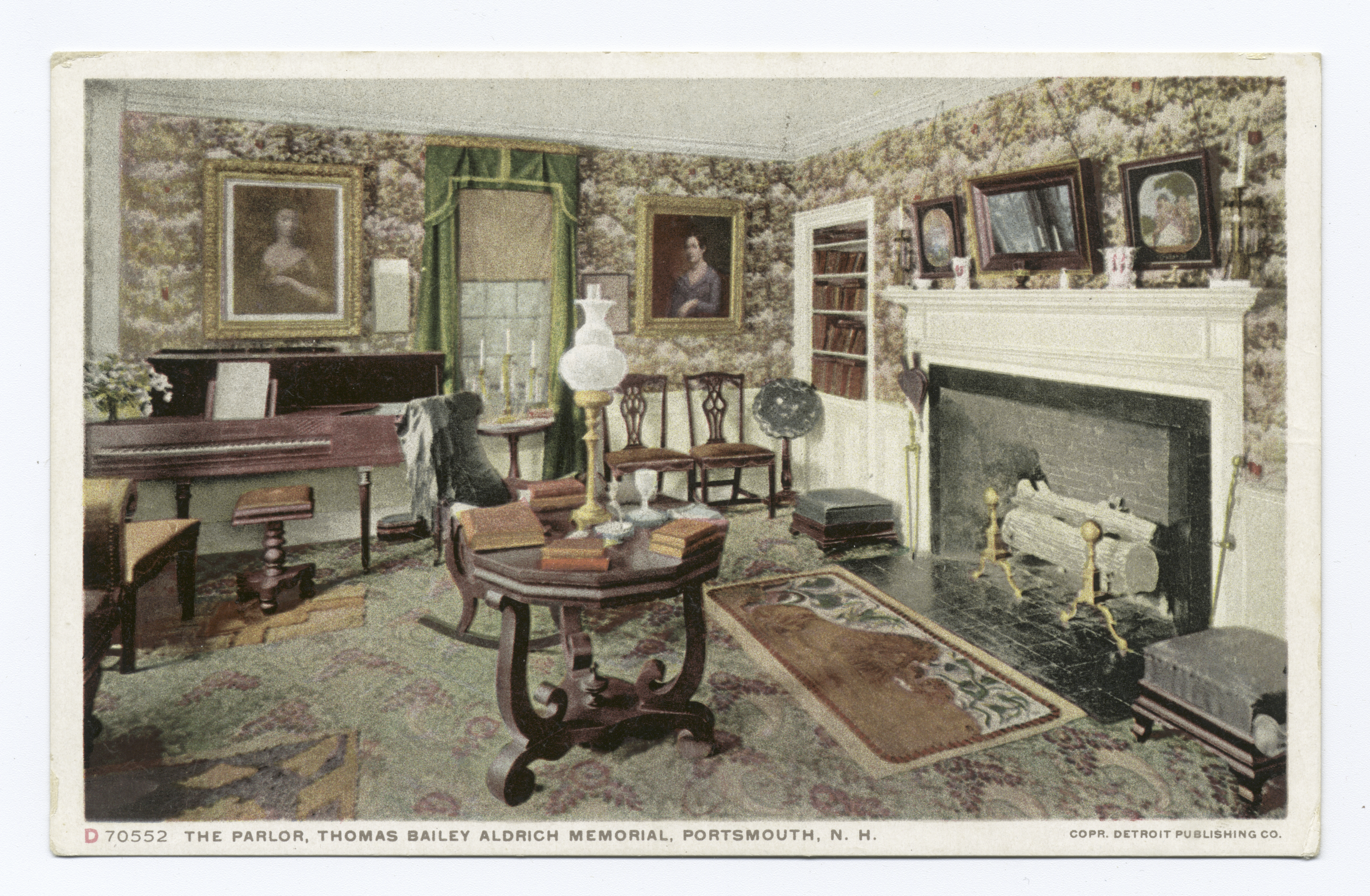
The Parlor, Thomas Bailey Aldrich Memorial

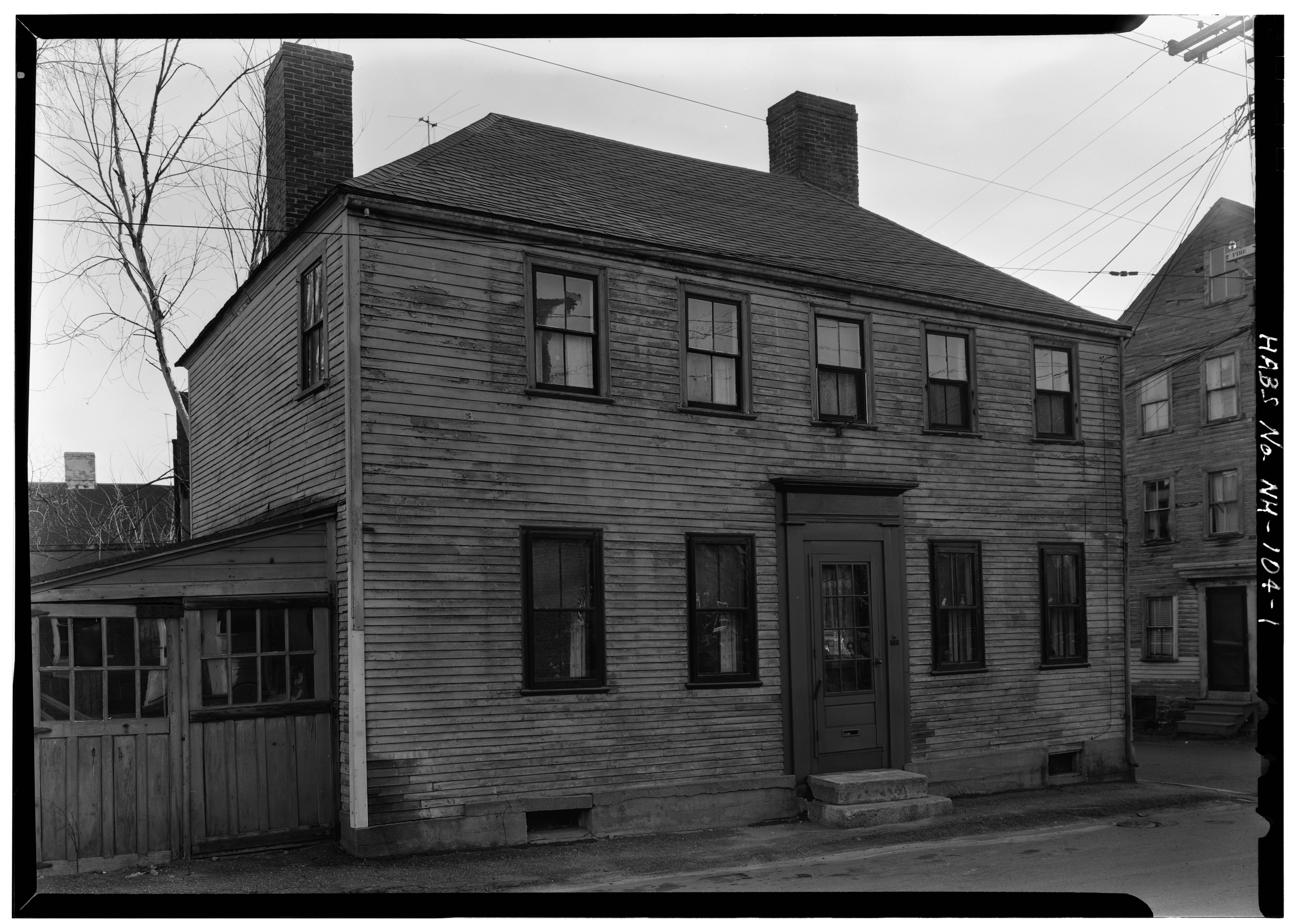
The Reuben Shapley House at 420 Court Street (Note: The Reuben Shapley House was later occupied by Josiah Bartlett Jr., President of the New Hampshire State Senate, a U.S. Congressman, and the son of a signer of the Declaration of Independence. The house has been restored since this early photo was taken.)

== See also ==
- National Register of Historic Places listings in Rockingham County, New Hampshire
