= Point of Graves Burial Ground =

Historic site in Rockingham County, New Hampshire

Coordinates: 43.0754°N 70.7509°W

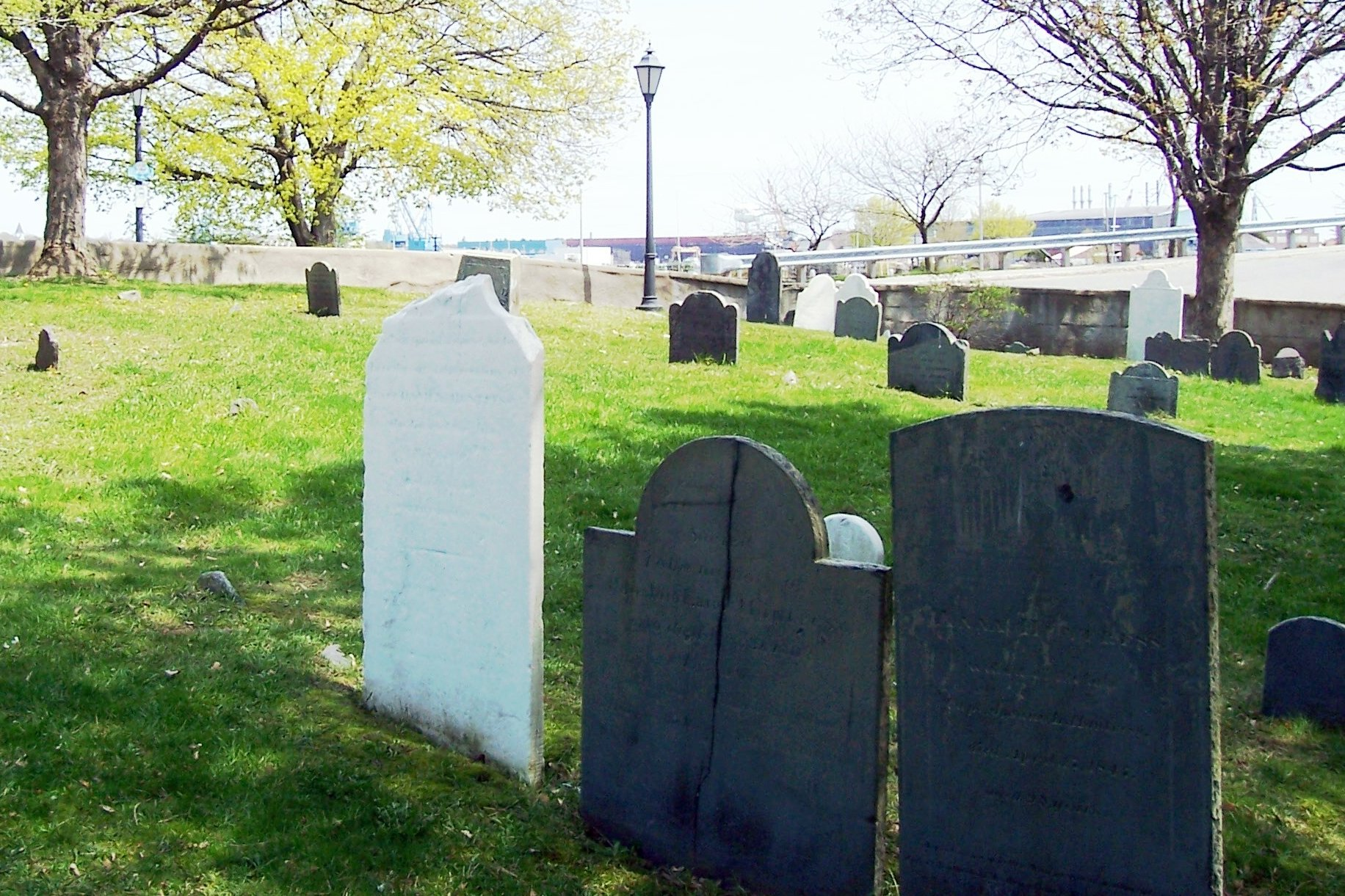
- View of burial ground
- Interactive map of Point of Graves Burial Ground

Details
- Established: c. 1682
- Location: Portsmouth, New Hampshire
- No. of graves: 125

Point of Graves Burial Ground is a small historic cemetery in Portsmouth, New Hampshire, dating to the 17th century. It was the final resting place for many of Portsmouth's prominent residents including the Wentworth family, the Vaughan family, (Note: Which has a large and ornate crypt with a stairway beneath leading to 28 unidentified skeletons within.) the Rogers, and the Lears. It is the oldest known surviving cemetery in Portsmouth, and one of the oldest in the state. (Note: An older cemetery was located near a mansion at Odiorne Point. It was said to be walled. However, the precise location was long ago lost to history. See Pannaway Plantation and Odiorne Point State Park) It has about 125 gravestones. Previously neglected, it is now well maintained by the Mayor's Committee and the city. The cemetery plot was on a point of land that directly overlooked the Piscataqua River in earlier times. (Note: "Point of Graves is aptly named, because at one time it sat almost directly on a point of land that looked directly at the Piscataqua River.")

== History ==
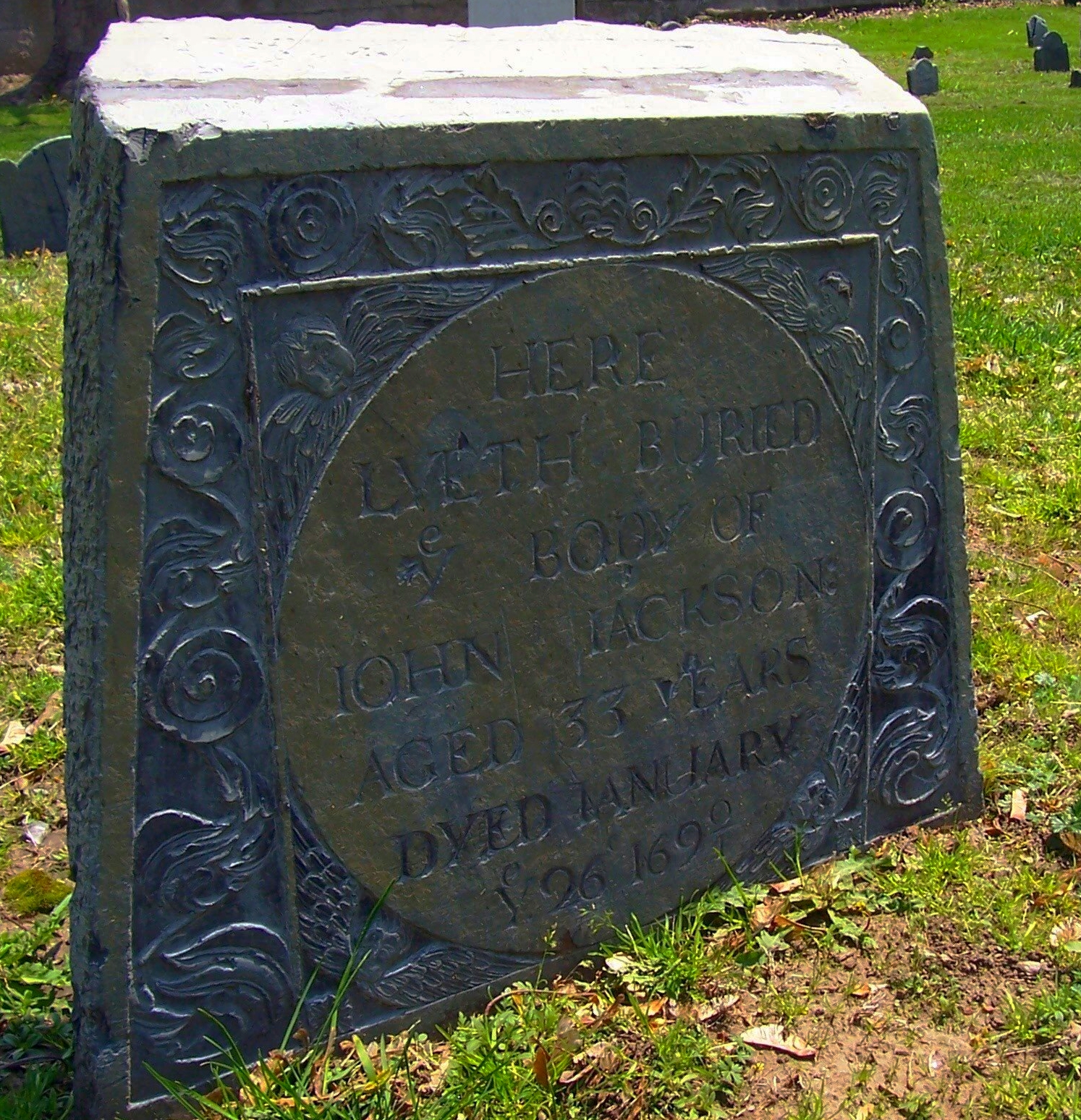
John Jackson headstone

Captain John Pickering II agreed to let the town have half an acre "upon the neck of land on which he liveth, where the people have been wont to be buried, which land shall be impropriated forever unto the use of a burying place." The earliest legible gravestone is dated 1682.

There are ghost stories related about the cemetery. Putative hauntings are part of tourist appeal.

It is believed that the area was used as a cemetery prior to its formal dedication. However, because Pickering retained use of the site for cattle grazing, many earlier stones were destroyed or damaged.

The cemetery has many fine examples of gravestone carvings by talented and noted New England carvers. (Note: Including Nathaniel Emmes; James Foster; John Hartshorne; John Homer; Joseph Mullicken; William Mumford, a Bostonian Quaker; someone designated only by the initials "JN" (maybe silversmith John Noyes); perhaps master carver Joseph Lamson of Charlestown and his two sons, Caleb and Nathaniel.) Because of its extended use, there are many examples illustrating the fashionable evolution of headstone symbolism, iconography, imagery and monumental inscription.

Elizabeth Elatson (d. 1704–05), a house fire victim, is buried there. The report in The Boston News-Letter was the first published account of a house fire in America. (Note: "Elizabeth Elatson d.1704-05 helped rescue someone but died from her injuries two months later. The news reported in the Boston News-Letter was the first published account of a house fire in America.")

It is one of six cemeteries owned and maintained by the City of Portsmouth, which is working under a comprehensive maintenance and restoration program. It is supported via the Historic Cemeteries Trust Fund.

== Location ==
It is located on the south side of Mechanic Street opposite Prescott Park, between Marcy Street and the Peirce Island Bridge. The area around it was once a center of coastal trade and warehouses.

Tours of the graveyard are offered by local author Roxie Zwicker. Yankee Magazine named it to the top five "best cemetery tours in New England" in 2017. That evaluation seems to depend both on the cemetery, and the identity of the knowledgeable and amusing docent, who opines that "cemeteries are art museums," is paired with a claimed spectral sidekick, and has visited over 400 New England burial grounds.

== See also ==
- John Paul Jones House
