= Titus Salter =

American military commander and privateer (1722–1798)

Captain Titus Salter (1722–1798) was an American military commander of militia forces in New Hampshire, a merchant, and a privateer. He helped draw up plans for the defense of Portsmouth. He was a military commander during the American Revolution. His home in Portsmouth is documented in a photograph held by the Library of Congress and is a site on area walking tours. The Journal of the House, Tuesday, December 30, 1777, New Hampshire Provincial Papers, volume VIII, p. 758, documents the appointment Capt. Titus Salter as Commander of Fort Washington in New Hampshire. He was the son of John Salter who immigrated from England.

There is a Salter Street in Portsmouth.

== Career ==
Salter captained John Langdon's Hampden during the Penobscot Expedition in 1779.

Fort Sullivan was built atop a bluff in Kittery, Maine, and in conjunction with Fort Washington across the Piscataqua River on Peirce Island, it guarded the channel to Portsmouth. The militia withdrew about three years later. The fort was reactivated for the War of 1812 in 1814. In 1861, it was rebuilt with eleven 8-inch Rodman guns to protect Portsmouth against attacks by the Confederate navy.

He was in charge of a matross company.

== Family ==
His son was also named Titus Salter (January 8, 1764 – January 27, 1840), and was also a captain. The younger Titus Salter was born in Portsmouth and was buried at the Proprietors Burying Ground (Auburn Street Cemetery) in Portsmouth. They had prominent descendants.

Titus Salter married Elizabeth Bickford.

== See also ==
- Harbor Defenses of Portsmouth
