= The Players' Ring Theatre =

Coordinates: 43°4′35.0″N 70°45′7.3″W

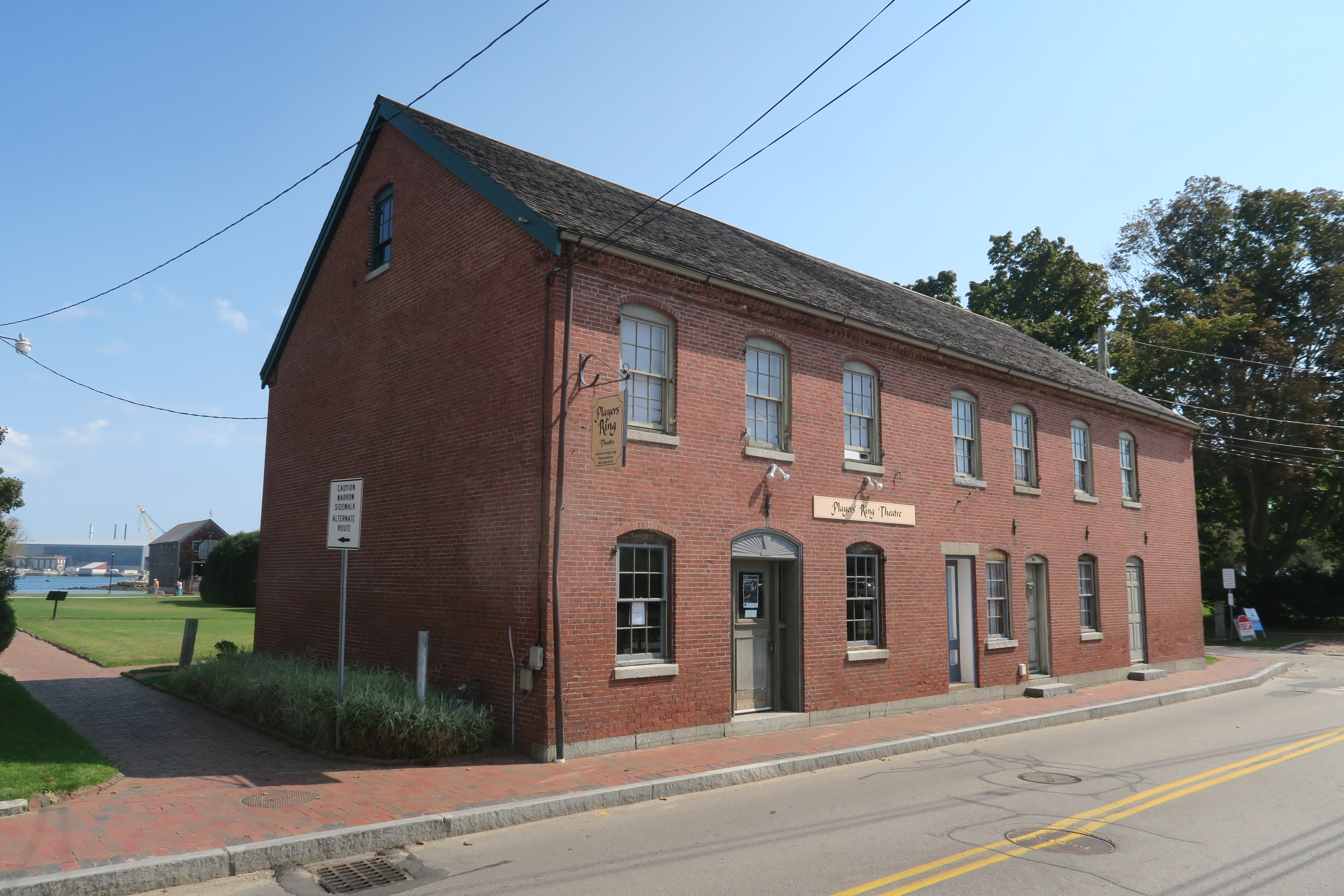
The Players' Ring Theatre

The Players Ring is a theater located in Portsmouth, New Hampshire, United States. The black box theater has a seating capacity of 75.

== History ==
The theater is located within a historic brick building built in 1833 in an area that has since become Prescott Park. It was once a building of the Portsmouth Marine Railway Company, and was listed on the New Hampshire State Register of Historic Places in 2006. In 2013, the theater planned to replace the seats in order to expand the artistic possibilities of a black box environment.

== Performances ==
The theater features work by new playwrights as well as the established.
