= Prescott Park (New Hampshire) =

Public park in Portsmouth, New Hampshire

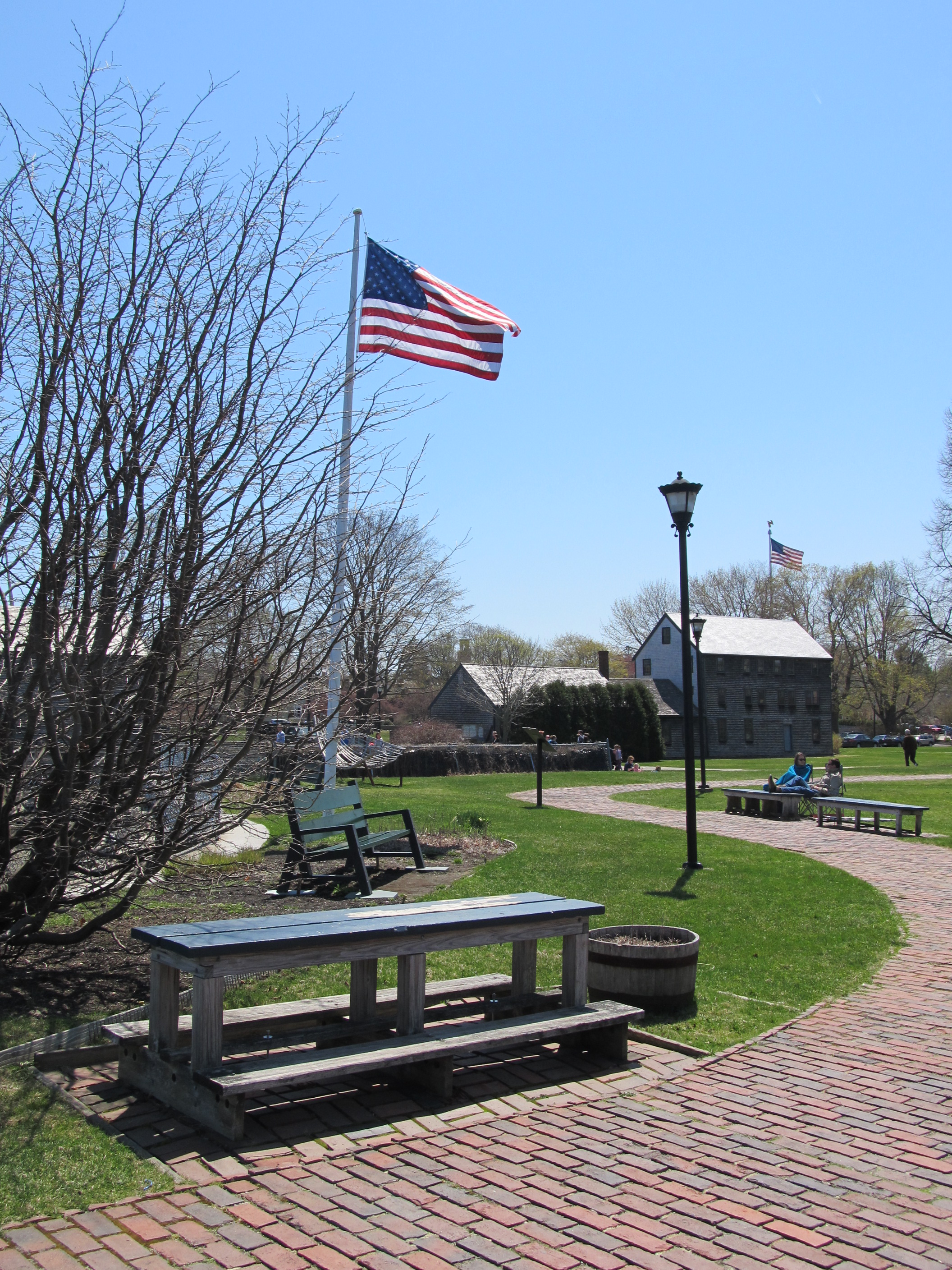
- Prescott Park, May 2015

- Location within New Hampshire
- Location: Portsmouth, New Hampshire
- Coordinates: 43°4′38″N 70°45′7″W

Prescott Park is a ten-plus acre waterfront park in Portsmouth, New Hampshire, United States. The land was purchased in the 1930s by two sisters, Josie and Mary Prescott. The sisters, public school teachers, had used an inheritance to systematically purchase and clear properties along the Piscataqua River. The sisters' goal was to create a public waterfront park, free and accessible to all, replacing what had become a run-down and seedy industrial area. In 1949 the Prescott sisters' trust was established with $500,000. The park was willed to the city of Portsmouth in 1954 for public enjoyment.

Prescott Park comprises over 10 acres (4.0 ha) of waterfront property along the Piscataqua River. Since 1974 it has hosted full outdoor productions of Broadway plays for family audiences during the summer months. There are also many flower gardens and water fountains maintained since the mid-1960s.

The park is directly across Marcy Street from the Strawbery Banke Museum.

The Players' Ring Theater is located in the park.
