= Piscataqua River =

River in Maine and New Hampshire, United States

Piscataqua River Pskehtekwis
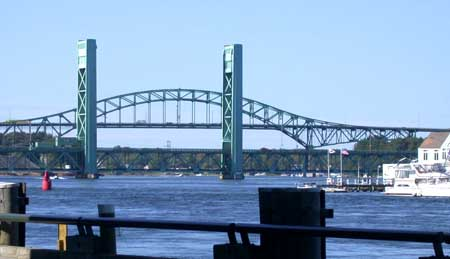
- Piscataqua River from Portsmouth, New Hampshire, with the former Sarah Mildred Long Bridge and the Piscataqua River Bridge (background)

- Location of mouth

Location
- Country: United States
- State: New Hampshire, Maine

Physical characteristics
- Source: Cochecho and Salmon Falls rivers
  - location: New Hampshire/Maine border, United States
  - coordinates: 43°10′34″N 70°49′29″W
  - elevation: 0 ft (0 m)
- Mouth: Atlantic Ocean
  - location: Portsmouth Harbor, New Hampshire/Maine border, United States
  - coordinates: 43°3′22″N 70°42′11″W
  - elevation: 0 ft (0 m)
- Length: 12 mi (19 km)

Basin features
- Tributaries
  - left: Salmon Falls River
  - right: Cochecho River, Great Bay

The Piscataqua River (/pɪˈskætəkwə/) is a 12-mile-long (19 km) tidal river forming the boundary of the U.S. states of New Hampshire and Maine from its origin at the confluence of the Salmon Falls River and Cochecho River to the Atlantic Ocean. The drainage basin of the river is approximately 1,495 square miles (3,870 km^{2}), including the subwatersheds of the Great Works River and the five rivers flowing into Great Bay: the Bellamy, Oyster, Lamprey, Squamscott, and Winnicut.

The river runs southeastward, with New Hampshire to the south and west and Maine to the north and east, and empties into the Gulf of Maine east of Portsmouth, New Hampshire. The last 6 miles (10 km) before the sea are known as Portsmouth Harbor and have a tidal current of around 4 knots (7.4 km/h; 4.6 mph). The river has very strong currents and is considered one of the swiftest in the United States. The cities/towns of Portsmouth, New Castle, Newington, Kittery and Eliot have developed around the harbor.

== History ==
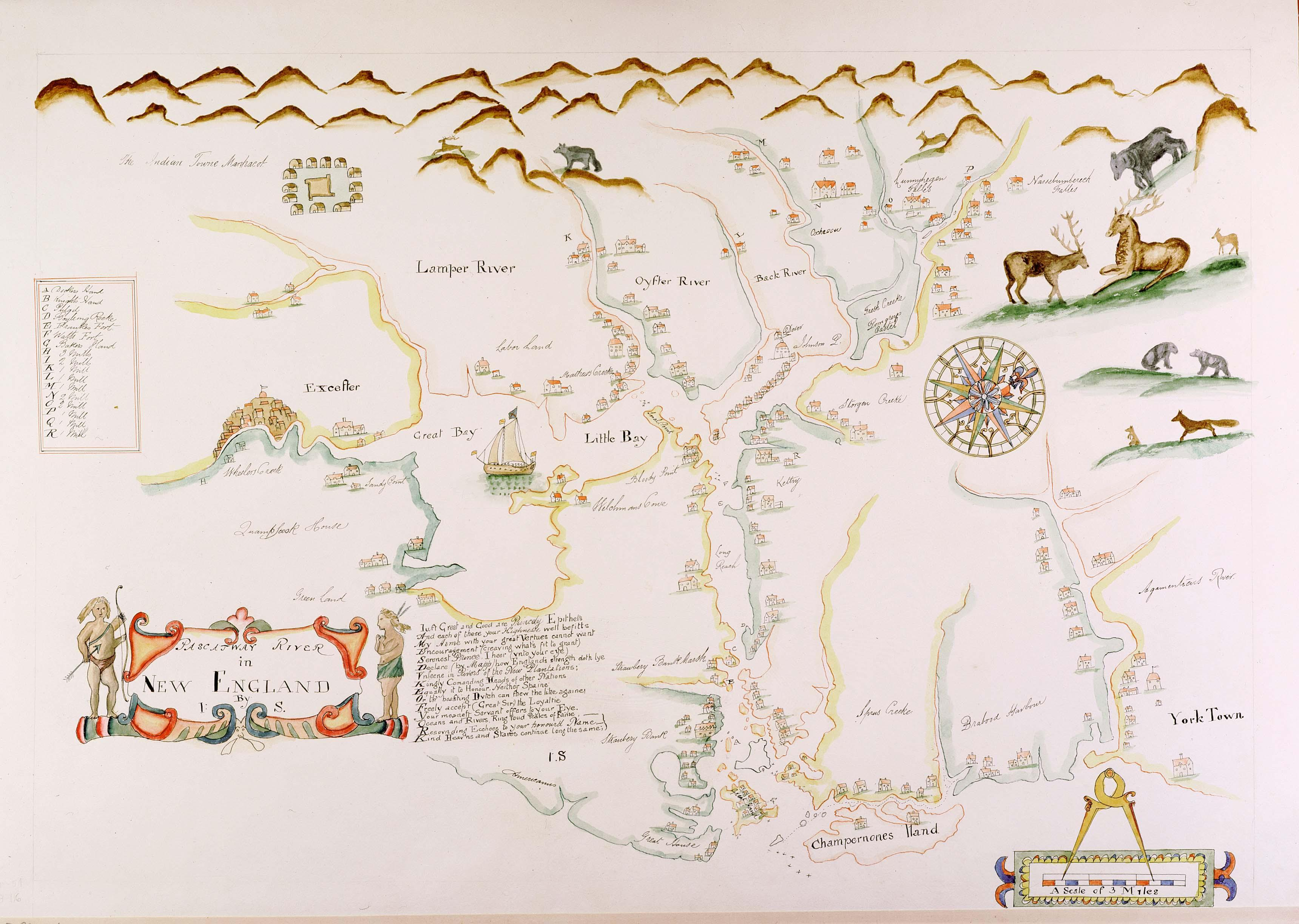
English map of Maine and New Hampshire, c. 1670

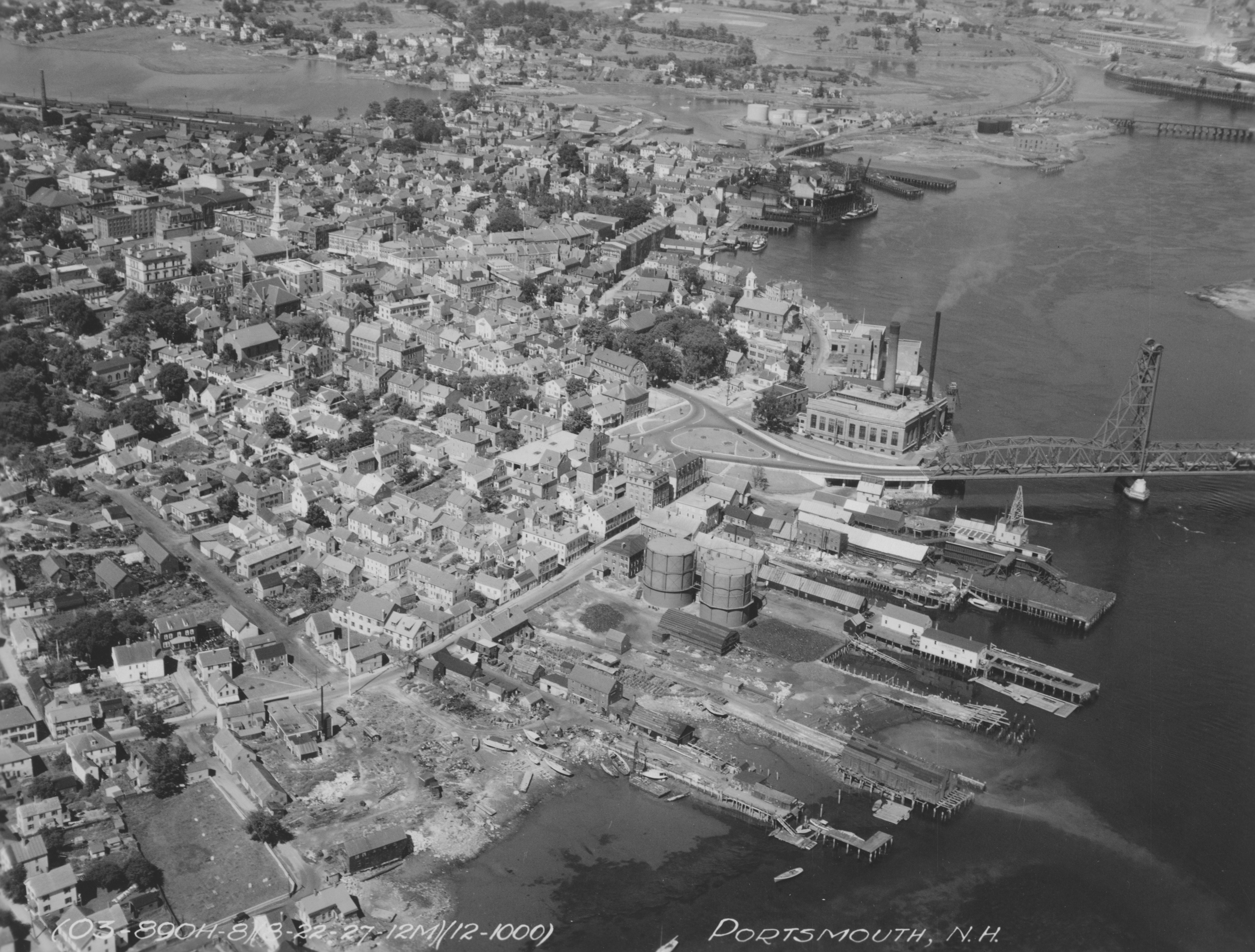
Port of Portsmouth, 1930s

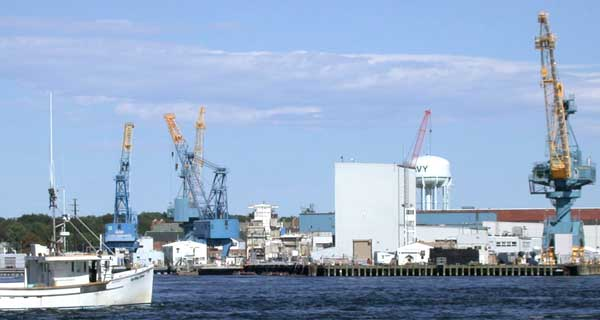
Portsmouth Naval Shipyard on the Kittery, Maine side of the river, across from Portsmouth, New Hampshire

Named by the area's original Abenaki inhabitants, the word Piscataqua is shrouded in some mystery as the Abenaki who uttered the name originally and their culture have been nearly erased from the Northeast in large; however through study and determination there are sources to reference, though the spelling and meaning are not exactly the same. Some believe the name to be a combination of peske (branch) with tegwe (a river with a strong current, possibly tidal). However, the Abenaki Dictionary by Bowman Books claims the word itself is pezgitegwa which means "a dark river".

The first known European to explore the river was Martin Pring in 1603. Captain John Smith placed a spelling similar to "Piscataqua" for the region on his map of 1614. The river was the site of the first sawmill in the colonies in 1623, the same year the contemporary spelling "Piscataqua" was first recorded.

Once salmon, sturgeon, oysters, clams, scallops, lobsters, mussels, eels, seals, and many others species of marine life were common in the river, evidenced by such tributaries as the Salmon Falls River, Sturgeon Creek, and Seal Rock in Eliot, Maine, the Oyster River in Durham, New Hampshire, and the Lamprey River in Newmarket, New Hampshire. All but the salmon and sturgeon remain abundant (although an increasing amount of verifiable sightings and encounters with Atlantic Salmon and Atlantic Sturgeon are being reported to New Hampshire Fish and Game), with fishing for striped bass and bluefish common recreational sports.

In the mid-1630s some of the region's earliest European settlers built a sawmill in what is today's Berwick, Maine, on a tributary above the head of tide of the Piscataqua. Thought to be the first over-shot water-powered site in America, it became known as the "Great Works", giving name to today's Great Works River.

John Wentworth, the colonial governor of New Hampshire, wrote to Admiral Graves from Boston on November 24, 1775, requesting a sufficient force to regain control of the Piscataqua River after rebel forces during the American War of Independence erected gun batteries on the shore to obstruct Royal Navy ships.

After the Allies' European victory in the Second World War, four surrendered German U-boats traveled upriver to the Portsmouth Naval Shipyard, with their captains and crews interned as POWs at Portsmouth Naval Prison. U-805 was the first to arrive, towed up the river to a rendezvous with U.S. officials on a tugboat off the Navy Yard on May 15, 1945. U-873 and U-1228 arrived the next day.

U-234, by far the greatest prize, arrived on May 19, seized off Nova Scotia by the U.S. destroyer escort Sutton. It had left Germany with a cargo bound for Japan of a disassembled Messerschmitt Me 262 jet plane, the most sophisticated fighter of World War II; two top Japanese scientists; and two high-ranking Nazi officers. While this was enough to create a media sensation, it was decades later before the U.S. government revealed that the sub also carried a top secret load of uranium oxide produced by the German atomic weapons program bound for a last-ditch Japanese effort. Instead, the extremely valuable nuclear material was diverted to the U.S.' top secret Manhattan Project, and ended up part of the bomb the U.S. Army Air Corps dropped over Hiroshima to hasten the end of the Pacific war.

The shipyard is located on Seavey's Island in Kittery, Maine near the Piscataqua's mouth. Long regarded by some as being in New Hampshire, the yard was claimed by that state into the 2000s. However, the Piscataqua River border dispute over Seavey's Island was settled by a 2001 U.S. Supreme Court decision which cited a 1977 decision affirming New Hampshire's claim that the state borders met at the center of the river's navigable channel as described in a 1740 decree, thus placing the island in Maine.

== Estuary ==
The Piscataqua River and its tributaries, including Great Bay, form a substantial estuarine environment. Two rivers, the Salmon Falls and Cochecho, join to form the Piscataqua on the eastern edge of Dover, New Hampshire, at the northwest corner of Eliot, Maine. Five rivers with tidal stretches flow into Great Bay: the Bellamy, Oyster, Lamprey, Squamscott, and Winnicut, and the Great Works River drains into the tidal portion of the Salmon Falls.

== See also ==
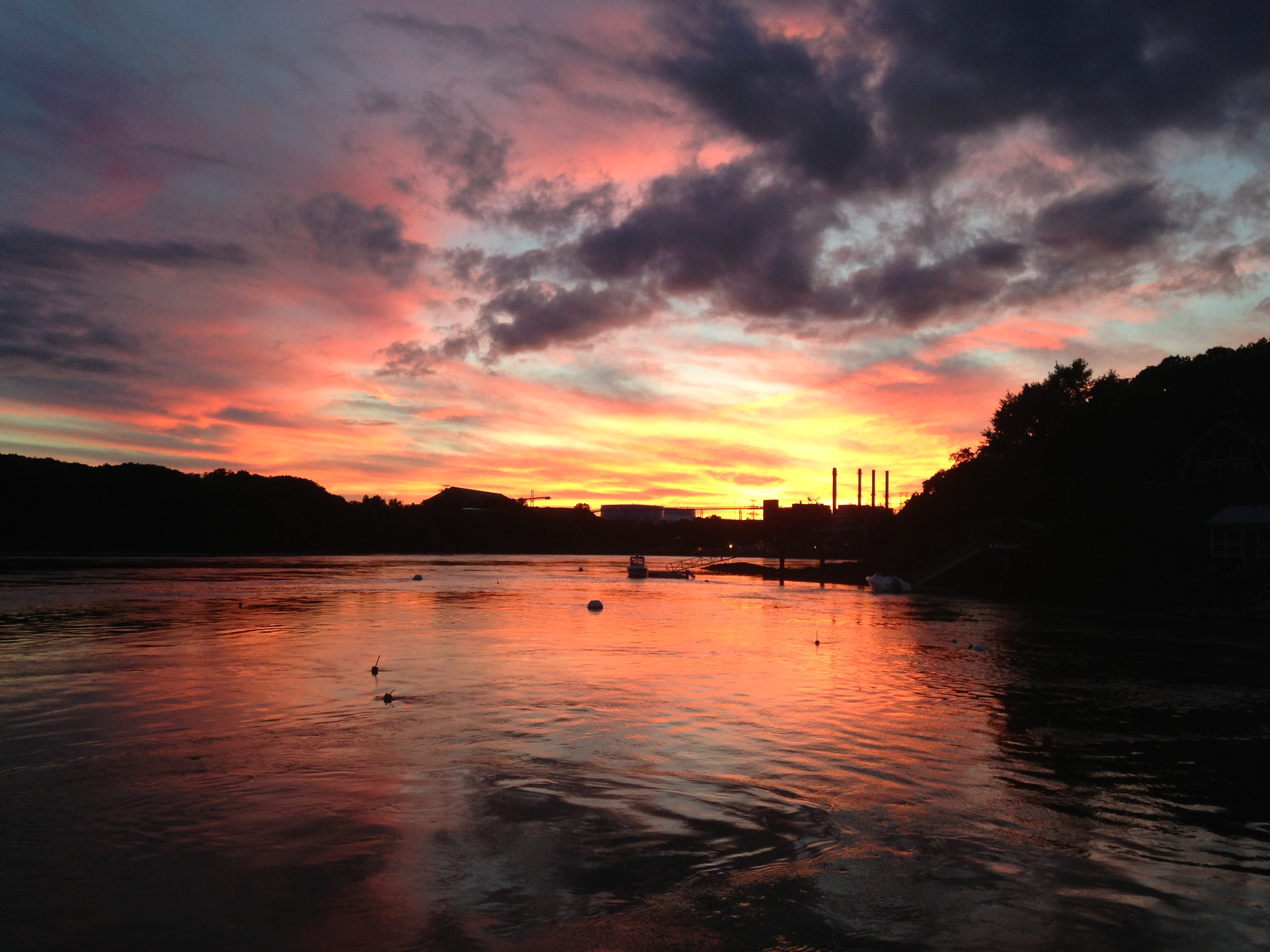
Sunset over the Piscataqua River on the Long Reach, Eliot, Maine (right)

- Badger's Island
- Great Bay (New Hampshire)
- Little Bay Bridge
- List of rivers of Maine
- List of rivers of New Hampshire
- Memorial Bridge (Portsmouth, New Hampshire)
- Piscataqua River Bridge
- Point of Graves Burial Ground
- Prescott Park (New Hampshire)
- Sarah Mildred Long Bridge
