= List of museums in New Hampshire =

This list of museums in New Hampshire is a list of museums, defined for this context as institutions (including nonprofit organizations, government entities, and private businesses) that collect and care for objects of cultural, artistic, scientific, or historical interest and make their collections or related exhibits available for public viewing. Museums that exist only in cyberspace (i.e., virtual museums) are not included. Also included are non-profit art galleries.

Name	Location	County	Region	Type	Notes
Abbot-Spaulding House	Nashua	Hillsborough	Merrimack Valley	Historic house	Operated by the Nashua Historical Society, Federal Revival style house
Academy Hall Museum	Lyme	Grafton	Dartmouth-Lake Sunapee	Local history	
Academy Museum	Walpole	Cheshire	Monadnock	Local history	Operated by the Walpole Historical Society, features large clothing collection
Aidron Duckworth Art Museum	Meriden	Sullivan	Dartmouth-Lake Sunapee	Art	website, artworks of Aidron Duckworth
Albany Historical Society Museum	Albany	Carroll	White Mountains Region	Local history	
Alstead Historical Museum	Alstead	Cheshire	Monadnock	Local history	Open Sundays in the summer
Always Ready Engine House	Hollis	Hillsborough	Merrimack Valley	Fire	Operated by the Hollis Historical Society, also contains a hearse
American Independence Museum	Exeter	Rockingham	Seacoast	History	Stories of the American Revolution, includes the 18th-century Ladd-Gilman House
America's Credit Union Museum	Manchester	Hillsborough	Merrimack Valley	History	Site of the first credit union founded in the United States
Amos J. Blake House Museum	Fitzwilliam	Cheshire	Monadnock	Historic house	Facebooksite, home of the Fitzwilliam Historical Society
Amoskeag Fishways Learning and Visitors Center	Manchester	Hillsborough	Merrimack Valley	Natural history	website, environmental education center, exhibits focus on the Merrimack River watershed, historical use of the Amoskeag area, and river wildlife
Andover Historical Society Museum	Andover	Merrimack	Dartmouth-Lake Sunapee	Railway	Includes a historic railroad station, also operates the Tucker Mountain Schoolhouse
Andres Institute of Art	Brookline	Hillsborough	Merrimack Valley	Art	140-acre (57 ha) sculpture park
Ashland Railroad Station Museum	Ashland	Grafton	Lakes Region	Railway	Operated by the Ashland Historical Society
AVA Gallery	Lebanon	Grafton	Dartmouth-Lake Sunapee	Art	website, operated by the Alliance for Visual Art
Aviation Museum of New Hampshire	Manchester	Hillsborough	Merrimack Valley	Aviation	Home of the New Hampshire Aviation Historical Society, located in Manchester-Boston Regional Airport, history of aviation in NH, aviation science and technology
Barrett House	New Ipswich	Hillsborough	Monadnock	Historic house	Federal style American mansion operated by Historic New England
Belknap Mill	Laconia	Belknap	Lakes Region	Industry	Historic textile mill, industrial knitting museum, art and history center
Bethlehem Heritage Society Museum	Bethlehem	Grafton	White Mountains Region	Local history	
Boscawen Historical Museum	Boscawen	Merrimack	Merrimack Valley	Local history	Operated by the Boscawen Historical Society
Canaan Historical Society Museum	Canaan	Grafton	Dartmouth-Lake Sunapee	Local history	
Campton Historical Society Museum	Campton	Grafton	White Mountains Region	Local history	
Canterbury Shaker Village	Canterbury	Merrimack	Merrimack Valley	Open-air	Includes 25 original and four reconstructed Shaker buildings on 694 acres (2.81 km^{2})
Carey House	Milford	Hillsborough	Merrimack Valley	Historic house	website, home of the Milford Historical Society
Castle in the Clouds	Moultonborough	Carroll	Lakes Region	Historic house	Arts & Crafts estate built in 1913-1914, over 45 miles (72 km) of trails on 5,000 acres (20 km^{2}), science programs for children
Chapel Museum	Amherst	Hillsborough	Merrimack Valley	Local history	website, operated by the Historical Society of Amherst, NH
Chatham Historical Society Museum	Chatham	Carroll	White Mountains Region	Local history	
Chichester Historical Society Museum	Chichester	Merrimack	Merrimack Valley	Local history	
Children's Museum of New Hampshire	Dover	Strafford	Seacoast	Children's	website
Claremont Historical Society Museum	Claremont	Sullivan	Dartmouth-Lake Sunapee	Local history	
Clark House Museum Complex	Wolfeboro	Carroll	Lakes Region	Historic house	website, operated by the Wolfeboro Historical Society, also includes a firehouse museum and schoolhouse
Clark's Trading Post	North Woodstock	Grafton	White Mountains Region	Multiple	Includes trained bear show, White Mountain Central Railroad train rides, Seyranyan Family Circus, Americana Museum, Pemigewasset Hook and Ladder Fire Station, Clark Museum about the Clark family, Florence Murray Museum of oddities, Avery's Garage and more
Colebrook Area Historical Society	Colebrook	Coos	Great North Woods	Local history	Museum located on 2nd floor of Colebrook Town Hall
Contoocook Railroad Depot	Contoocook	Merrimack	Merrimack Valley	Railway	website Historic site, railroad museum, and visitor center
Currier Museum of Art	Manchester	Hillsborough	Merrimack Valley	Art	European and American paintings, decorative arts, photographs and sculpture
Danbury North Road Schoolhouse Museum	Danbury	Merrimack	Lakes Region	Local history	1853 red one-room schoolhouse operated by the Danbury Historical Society
Daniel Webster Birthplace State Historic Site	Franklin	Belknap	Lakes Region	Historic house	website, managed by the New Hampshire Division of Parks and Recreation, late 18th-century log cabin, birthplace of politician Daniel Webster
Derry Museum of History	Derry	Rockingham	Merrimack Valley	Local history	
District #5 School	East Washington	Sullivan	Dartmouth-Lake Sunapee	Education	Operated by the Washington Historical Society
Dorchester Historical Museum	Dorchester	Grafton	Dartmouth-Lake Sunapee	Local history	
Dublin Schoolhouse Museum	Dublin	Cheshire	Monadnock	Local history	Operated by the Dublin Historical Society
Durham Historic Museum	Durham	Strafford	Seacoast	Local history	Operated by the Durham Historic Association
Eastman Lord House	Conway	Carroll	White Mountains Region	Historic house	Operated by the Conway Historical Society
Elisha Marston House Museum	Center Sandwich	Carroll	Lakes Region	Local history	Home of the Sandwich Historical Society
Enfield Shaker Museum	Enfield	Grafton	Dartmouth-Lake Sunapee	Religious	Shaker buildings and history
Epping Historical Society Museum	Epping	Rockingham	Seacoast	Local history	
Exeter Historical Society	Exeter	Rockingham	Seacoast	Local history	website, museum with artifacts of local history
The Fells	Newbury	Merrimack	Dartmouth-Lake Sunapee	Historic house	Early 20th century summer estate on 83 acres, located adjacent to the John Hay National Wildlife Refuge
Fitts Museum	Candia	Rockingham	Merrimack Valley	Local history	website
Florence H. Speare Memorial Museum	Nashua	Hillsborough	Merrimack Valley	Local history	website, operated by the Nashua Historical Society
Fort at Number 4	Charlestown	Sullivan	Dartmouth-Lake Sunapee	Living history	1744 period British fort with living history guides, set during King George's War
Francestown Improvement and Historical Society Museum	Francestown	Hillsborough	Monadnock	History	website
Franconia Heritage Museum	Franconia	Grafton	White Mountains Region	Local history	website
Franklin Pierce Homestead	Hillsborough	Hillsborough	Monadnock	Historic house	Operated by the Hillsborough Historical Society, early-19th-century childhood home of President Franklin Pierce
Fremont Historical Museum	Fremont	Rockingham	Seacoast	Local history	Operated by the Fremont Historical Society
The Frost Place	Franconia	Grafton	White Mountains Region	Historic house	Home of poet Robert Frost, museum and center for poetry and the arts
Funspot Family Fun Center: American Classic Arcade Museum	Laconia	Belknap	Lakes Region	Amusement	Arcade games, pinball machines, and electro-mechanic games built no later than 1987
Gilman Garrison House	Exeter	Rockingham	Seacoast	Historic house	Operated by Historic New England, 18th-century house with exhibits on local history
Harold S. Gilman Museum	Alton	Belknap	Lakes Region	Local history	Collection of guns, furniture, dolls, buttons, toys and local artifacts, operated by the Alton Historical Society
Gilmanton Historical Society	Gilmanton	Belknap	Lakes Region	Local history	Museum in the Old Town Hall in Gilmanton Iron Works
Glidden Toy Museum	Ashland	Grafton	Lakes Region	Toy	Operated by the Ashland Historical Society, more than two thousand antique toys, open in summer on a limited basis
Goffstown Historical Society Museum	Goffstown	Hillsborough	Merrimack Valley	Local history	website
Gorham Historical Society Museum	Gorham	Coos	White Mountains Region	Railway	website, historic train depot, railroad cars and artifacts, model railroad
Governor John Langdon House	Portsmouth	Rockingham	Seacoast	Historic house	18th-century-period mansion
Grant Hall Museum of Ossipee History	Center Ossipee	Carroll	Lakes Region	Local history	Operated by the Ossipee Historical Society
Great Bay Discovery Center	Greenland	Rockingham	Seacoast	Natural history	website, conservation-education headquarters for the Great Bay National Estuarine Research Reserve, interactive exhibits and natural trails
Greenfield Historical Society Museum	Greenfield	Hillsborough	Monadnock	Local history	
Hampstead Historic Library Museum	Hampstead	Rockingham	Seacoast	Local history	website, collection of the Hampstead Historical Society
Hancock Historical Society	Hancock	Hillsborough	Monadnock	Local history	website
Hartmann Model Railroad & Toy Museum	Intervale	Carroll	White Mountains Region	Railway	website, information
Haverhill Historical Society Museum	Haverhill	Grafton	White Mountains Region	Local history	website
Henniker Historical Society Museum	Henniker	Merrimack	Merrimack Valley	Local history	website, located in Academy Hall
Henry Wilson Museum	Farmington	Strafford	Lakes Region	Local history	Operated by the Farmington Historical Society at the Goodwin Library
Historical Society of Cheshire County Museum	Keene	Cheshire	Monadnock	Local history	website, located in the former Ball Residence, also tours of Wyman Tavern
Holderness Historical Society Museum	Holderness	Grafton	Lakes Region	Local history	
Hood Museum of Art	Hanover	Grafton	Dartmouth-Lake Sunapee	Art	Part of Dartmouth College, collections include art from ancient cultures, the Americas, Europe, Africa, Papua New Guinea and other world regions
Hopkins Center for the Arts	Hanover	Grafton	Dartmouth-Lake Sunapee	Art	Part of Dartmouth College, includes performing and visual arts center
Hopkinton Historical Society	Hopkinton	Merrimack	Merrimack Valley	Local history	Housed in the William H. Long Memorial Building
Horatio Colony House Museum	Keene	Cheshire	Monadnock	Historic house	website
Hudson Historical Society	Hudson	Hillsborough	Merrimack Valley	Local history	Located in the late 19th-century Hills House
Jackson House	Portsmouth	Rockingham	Seacoast	Historic house	Operated by Historic New England, 17th-century house
James House Museum	Hampton	Rockingham	Seacoast	Historic house	Early 18th-century house
Jefferson Historical Society Museum	Jefferson	Coos	White Mountains Region	Local history	
John Paul Jones House	Portsmouth	Rockingham	Seacoast	History	Operated by the Portsmouth Historical Society, 18th-century home lived in by American naval hero John Paul Jones, features exhibits of local history
John Wingate Weeks Estate	Lancaster	Coos	Great North Woods	Historic house	Operated by the New Hampshire Division of Parks and Recreation
Kendall Shop Museum and Carriage House	Bedford	Hillsborough	Merrimack Valley	Local history	Operated by the Bedford Historical Society
Kimball House Museum	Atkinson	Rockingham	Seacoast	Local history	Operated by the Atkinson Historical Society
Kimball Jenkins Estate	Concord	Merrimack	Merrimack Valley	Art	website, art school with public galleries
Laconia Historical and Museum Society	Laconia	Belknap	Lakes Region	Local history	website, exhibits and programs at the Laconia Public Library
Lake Winnipesaukee Museum	Weirs Beach	Belknap	Lakes Region	Local history	website, operated by the Lake Winnipesaukee Historical Society
Lane Tavern	Sanbornton Square	Belknap	Lakes Region	Local history	website, home of the Sanbornton Historical Society
Lawrence L. Lee Scouting Museum	Manchester	Hillsborough	Merrimack Valley	Scouting	Located at Camp Carpenter, Boy Scout memorabilia and library
Lee Historical Society Museum	Lee	Strafford	Seacoast	Local history	
Libby Museum	Wolfeboro	Carroll	Lakes Region	Natural history	Open seasonally
Lisbon Area Historical Museum	Lisbon	Grafton	White Mountains Region	Local history	
Little Nature Museum	Warner	Merrimack	Merrimack Valley	Natural history	website
Little Red Schoolhouse Museum	Newport	Sullivan	Dartmouth-Lake Sunapee	School	Operated by the National Society Daughters of the American Revolution
Littleton Area Historical Society	Littleton	Grafton	White Mountains Region	Local history	
Lockhaven Schoolhouse Museum	Enfield	Grafton	Dartmouth-Lake Sunapee	School	information
Loon Center	Moultonborough	Carroll	Lakes Region	Natural history	website
Madison Historical Society Museum	Madison	Carroll	Lakes Region	Local history	
Main Street House Museum	Warner	Merrimack	Dartmouth-Lake Sunapee	History	website, operated by the Warner Historical Society in the Upton/Chandler House
Main Street Museum	Meredith	Belknap	Lakes Region	Local history	website, home of the Meredith Historical Society
Margret and H.A. Rey Center	Waterville Valley	Grafton	White Mountains Region	Art	Includes an art gallery, programs in art, science, nature and children's literature
Marion Blodgett Museum	North Stratford	Coos	Great North Woods	Local history	Operated by the Cohos Historical Society
Mariposa Museum	Peterborough	Hillsborough	Monadnock	Culture	website, folk art, textiles, costumes, art, puppets, toys and instruments from six continents
Marshall House Museum	Newton	Rockingham	Seacoast	Local history	Open by appointment with the Newton Historical Society
Mary Baker Eddy Historic House	Rumney	Grafton	Lakes Region	Historic house	website
McAuliffe-Shepard Discovery Center	Concord	Merrimack	Merrimack Valley	Air and space science	Exhibits on astronomy, engineering, Earth and space sciences, honors the memories of Christa McAuliffe and Alan Shepard
Melville Academy Museum	Jaffrey	Cheshire	Monadnock	Local history	website, operated by the Jaffrey Historical Society
Merrimack Historical Society Museum	Merrimack	Hillsborough	Merrimack Valley	Local history	website
Millyard Museum	Manchester	Hillsborough	Merrimack Valley	Local history	website, operated by the Manchester Historic Association in the historic Amoskeag Millyard, city history, immigrants, textile industry
Moffatt-Ladd House	Portsmouth	Rockingham	Seacoast	Historic house	Owned and operated by the National Society of the Colonial Dames in the State of New Hampshire, 18th-century house reflecting owners from 1763 through 1900
Moffett House Museum & Genealogy Center	Berlin	Coos	Great North Woods	Local history	website, operated by the Berlin and Coos Historical Society
Monadnock Center for History and Culture	Peterborough	Hillsborough	Monadnock	Local history	website, operated by the Peterborough Historical Society, includes a late 18th-century period kitchen, early American furniture and decorative arts, local history and culture
Mont Vernon Historical Society Museum	Mont Vernon	Hillsborough	Merrimack Valley	Local history	
Morrison House Museum	Londonderry	Rockingham	Merrimack Valley	Historic house	website, operated by the Londonderry Historical Society, 18th-century farmhouse
Moultonborough Town House	Moultonborough	Carroll	Lakes Region	Local history	Operated by the Moultonborough Historical Society
Mount Kearsarge Indian Museum	Warner	Merrimack	Dartmouth-Lake Sunapee	Ethnic - Native American	website
Mount Washington Observatory Museum	Sargent's Purchase	Coos	White Mountains Region	Science	website, focuses on weather and geology
MWV Children's Museum	North Conway	Carroll	White Mountains Region	Children's	website
Museum of the White Mountains	Plymouth	Grafton	Lakes Region	History	Operated by Plymouth State University, history, culture, and environmental legacy of the region
Museum of White Mountain Art	Jackson	Carroll	White Mountains Region	Multiple	website, operated by the Jackson Historical Society, display of White Mountain School of Art paintings as well as changing local history exhibits, permanent exhibit of old maps of the area
Muster Field Farm Museum	North Sutton	Merrimack	Dartmouth-Lake Sunapee	Agriculture	website, working farm museum with 18th-century homestead
New England Racing Museum	Loudon	Merrimack	Lakes Region	Sports - Motor Racing	History of motor racing within the New England Region website
New England Ski Museum	Franconia	Grafton	White Mountains Region	Sports - Skiing	History of commercial and recreational skiing in the northeastern United States, located in Franconia Notch State Park
New Hampshire Boat Museum	Wolfeboro	Carroll	Lakes Region	Maritime	website
New Hampshire Farm Museum	Milton	Strafford	Lakes Region	Agriculture	Includes historic farmhouse and tavern, agricultural machinery, farm tools, sleighs and wagons, farm animals
New Hampshire Historical Society	Concord	Merrimack	Merrimack Valley	History	State history and culture
New Hampshire Snowmobile Museum	Allenstown	Merrimack	Merrimack Valley	Sports	Located in Bear Brook State Park
New Hampshire State House	Concord	Merrimack	Merrimack Valley	Historic building	Guided and self-guided tours available on weekdays
New Hampshire Telephone Museum	Warner	Merrimack	Dartmouth-Lake Sunapee	Commodity	website, collection of historic telephones
New London Historical Society	New London	Merrimack	Dartmouth-Lake Sunapee	Living history	website, small village of 19th-century buildings and many horse-drawn vehicles
Newport Historical Society Museum	Newport	Sullivan	Dartmouth-Lake Sunapee	Local history	
Northern Forest Heritage Park	Berlin	Coos	Great North Woods	Industry	website, includes full-size replica logging camp, logging tools and equipment, Brown Company House Museum, artisans display gallery, 3 acre park
Northwood Historical Society Museum	Northwood	Rockingham	Merrimack Valley	Local history	
Nottingham Square Schoolhouse Museum	Nottingham	Rockingham	Merrimack Valley	Education	Open by appointment, historic schoolhouse
Old Country Store and Museum	Moultonborough	Carroll	Lakes Region	Historic store	
Old Webster Meeting House	Webster	Merrimack	Dartmouth-Lake Sunapee	Local history	
Old River Road School	Bridgewater	Grafton	Lakes Region	Local history	information, scroll down to Bridgewater Historical Society
Old Town Hall	Newington	Rockingham	Seacoast	History	website
Patuccoway Grange Museum	Nottingham	Rockingham	Merrimack Valley	History	Open by appointment, implements of farming, early industry and home life
Peabody Farm Museum	Shelburne	Coos	White Mountains Region	Local history	
Pierce Manse	Concord	Merrimack	Merrimack Valley	Historic house	Home of President Franklin Pierce
Pittsburg Historical Society Museum	Pittsburg	Coos	Great North Woods	Local history	Museum located in Town Hall
Plaistow Historical Society	Plaistow	Rockingham	Seacoast	Local history	website
Plymouth Historical Society Museum	Plymouth	Grafton	Lakes Region	Local history	Located in a former county courthouse and library
Poore Family Homestead and Historic Farm Museum	Colebrook	Coos	Great North Woods	Historic house	website, historic farmstead that portrays one family's life from the 1830s to the 1980s
Portsmouth Athenæum	Portsmouth	Rockingham	Seacoast	Library	Includes museum gallery with changing exhibitions from its collections
Pottle Meeting House	Meredith	Belknap	Lakes Region	Agriculture	Operated by the Meredith Historical Society, historic farm tools and agriculture equipment
Quimby Transportation Museum	Center Sandwich	Carroll	Lakes Region	Transportation	Operated by the Sandwich Historical Society, horse-drawn vehicles
Raymond Historical Society	Raymond	Rockingham	Merrimack Valley	Railway	Local history and railroad artifacts
Remick Country Doctor Museum & Farm	Tamworth	Carroll	Lakes Region	Agriculture	Working farm museum with museum farmhouse of a country doctor
Richard Diehl Civilian Conservation Corps Museum	Allenstown	Merrimack	Merrimack Valley	History	Work of the Civilian Conservation Corps in New Hampshire, located in Bear Brook State Park
Rindge Historical Society Museum	Rindge	Cheshire	Monadnock	Local history	
Robert Frost Farm	Derry	Rockingham	Merrimack Valley	Historic house	Home of poet Robert Frost
Rochester Museum of Fine Arts	Rochester	Strafford	Seacoast	Art	Contemporary art in all media
Rumney Historical Society Museum	Rumney	Grafton	Lakes Region	Local history	
Rundlet-May House	Portsmouth	Rockingham	Seacoast	Historic house	Operated by Historic New England, early-19th-century mansion reflecting four generations of ownership
Rye Historical Society Museum	Rye	Rockingham	Seacoast	Local history	website
Saint-Gaudens National Historic Site	Cornish	Sullivan	Dartmouth-Lake Sunapee	Historic house	Home, gardens, and studios of sculptor Augustus Saint-Gaudens
Salem Historical Museum	Salem	Rockingham	Merrimack Valley	Local history	Located in the Old Town Meeting House
Salisbury Historical Society Museum	Salisbury	Merrimack	Dartmouth-Lake Sunapee	Local history	website
Sandown Historical Society & Museum	Sandown	Rockingham	Seacoast	Local history	Located in a historic depot
Seacoast Science Center	Rye	Rockingham	Seacoast	Science center	website, marine science nature center
SEE Science Center	Manchester	Hillsborough	Merrimack Valley	Science center	website
Sharon Arts Center	Peterborough	Hillsborough	Monadnock	Art	website, arts center with fine art gallery
Sheridan House Museum	Winchester	Cheshire	Monadnock	Local history	Operated by the Winchester Historical Society
Springfield Historical Museum	West Springfield	Sullivan	Dartmouth-Lake Sunapee	Local history	Operated by the Springfield Historical Society
Stone Building Museum	Weare	Hillsborough	Merrimack Valley	Local history	website home of the Weare Historical Society
Stone School Museum	Newmarket	Rockingham	Seacoast	Local history	Operated by the Newmarket Historical Society
Strawbery Banke	Portsmouth	Rockingham	Seacoast	Living	Includes 10 houses with costumed interpreters reflecting the 17th through the 19th centuries, crafts demonstrations
Sugar Hill Historical Museum	Sugar Hill	Grafton	White Mountains Region	History	
Summersworth Historical Society	Somersworth	Strafford	Seacoast	Local history	
Thompson-Ames Historical Society Museums	Gilford	Belknap	Lakes Region	Local history	website, operates three museums that are open by appointment: Mount Belknap Grange, Union Meetinghouse, Benjamin Rowe House
Tip-Top House	Mount Washington State Park	Coos	White Mountains Region	History	Former hotel on Mount Washington
Tobias Lear House	Portsmouth	Rockingham	Seacoast	Historic house	Adjacent to Wentworth-Gardner House, mid 18th-century house
Troy Historical Society Museum	Troy	Cheshire	Monadnock	Local history	
Tuck Museum	Hampton	Rockingham	Seacoast	Open-air	website, includes Tuck Memorial Museum, Farm Museum, Seacoast Fire Museum and the 19th-Century District Schoolhouse
Tuftonboro Historical Society Museum	Melvin Village	Carroll	Lakes Region	Local history	information
University of New Hampshire Museum	Durham	Strafford	Seacoast	Local history	Located in the Dimond Library, hosts two exhibitions each year about the history of the University of New Hampshire
Upper Pemigewasset Historical Society and Museum	Lincoln	Grafton	White Mountains Region	Local history	website
USS Albacore (AGSS-569)	Portsmouth	Rockingham	Seacoast	Museum ship	Decommissioned submarine
Van Dame School Museum and Research Center	Nottingham	Rockingham	Merrimack Valley	History	Open by appointment, local history
Warner House	Portsmouth	Rockingham	Seacoast	Historic house	18th-century brick mansion, reflects six generations of family ownership
Warren Historical Museum	Warren	Grafton	White Mountains Region	Local history	Operated by the Warren Historical Society
Washington Historical Society Museum	Washington	Sullivan	Dartmouth-Lake Sunapee	Local history	
Webster Cottage Museum	Hanover	Grafton	Dartmouth-Lake Sunapee	Historic house	18th-century farmhouse and residence of Daniel Webster as a student at Dartmouth College, operated by the Hanover Historical Society
Wentworth-Coolidge Mansion	Portsmouth	Rockingham	Seacoast	Historic house	18th-century mansion of New Hampshire's first royal governor
Wentworth-Gardner House	Portsmouth	Rockingham	Seacoast	Historic house	18th-century mansion, adjacent to Tobias Lear House
Westmoreland Historical Society	Westmoreland	Cheshire	Monadnock	Local history	
Wheeler House	Hollis	Hillsborough	Merrimack Valley	Local history	Home of the Hollis Historical Society
Whipple House Museum	Ashland	Grafton	Lakes Region	Local history	Operated by the Ashland Historical Society
Wigwam Museum	Amherst	Hillsborough	Merrimack Valley	Local history	website, operated by the Historical Society of Amherst, NH
Wilder-Holton House	Lancaster	Coos	Great North Woods	Historic house	Operated by the Lancaster Historical Society
Windham Museum	Windham	Rockingham	Merrimack Valley	Local history	Open for events and by appointment
Works Barn Museum & Allard House	Freedom	Carroll	Lakes Region	History	Operated by the Freedom Historical Society
Woodman Institute Museum	Dover	Strafford	Seacoast	Multiple	Rocks & minerals, Indian artifacts, mammals & marine life, birds & butterflies, shells, snakes & turtles, dolls, military items, maps & documents, maritime, household and local history artifacts
Wright Museum	Wolfeboro	Carroll	Lakes Region	Military	website, dedicated to celebrating Americans' sacrifices and achievements during WWII
Wyman Tavern	Keene	Cheshire	Monadnock	Historic House	Owned by the Cheshire County Historical Society
Zimmerman House	Manchester	Hillsborough	Merrimack Valley	Historic house	Designed by Frank Lloyd Wright, operated by the Currier Museum of Art

== Defunct museums ==
- Children's Metamorphosis, Derry
- Christie's Maple Farm and Maple Museum, Lancaster

== See also ==
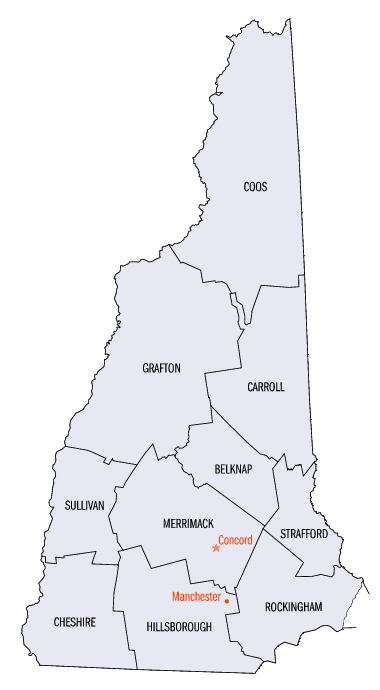
Counties of New Hampshire

- List of historical societies in New Hampshire
- List of nature centers in New Hampshire
