= List of nature centers in New Hampshire =

This is a list of nature centers and environmental education centers in the state of New Hampshire, United States.

To use the sortable tables: click on the icons at the top of each column to sort that column in alphabetical order; click again for reverse alphabetical order.

Name	Location	County	Region	Summary
Amoskeag Fishways	Manchester	Hillsborough	Merrimack Valley	website, 130 acres (53 ha), environmental education center about the Merrimack River watershed, operated by New Hampshire Audubon, the State and the USFWS, located at Amoskeag Falls
Bear Brook State Park	Allenstown	Merrimack	Merrimack Valley	Over 10,000 acres (4,000 ha) extending into Deerfield, Hooksett, and Candia, small 4-H nature center
Beaver Brook Association	Hollis	Hillsborough	Merrimack Valley	2,100 acres (850 ha) located in Hollis, Brookline, and Milford, New Hampshire, education center
Great Bay National Estuarine Research Reserve	Greenland	Rockingham	Seacoast	Great Bay Discovery Center features exhibits about the estuary's natural history, salt marsh farming, salmon migration, plankton, tides and research
Harris Center for Conservation Education	Hancock	Hillsborough	Monadnock	website, land trust and education center, over 16 miles (26 km) of trails
Loon Center	Moultonborough	Carroll	Lakes	website, exhibits, education and research about the state's common loons and other wildlife, 200-acre (81 ha) Markus Wildlife Sanctuary, operated by the Loon Preservation Committee
Margret and H.A. Rey Center	Waterville Valley	Grafton	White Mountains	Programs in nature, art, science, astronomy, art gallery
Massabesic Audubon Center	Auburn	Rockingham	Merrimack Valley	website, 130 acres (53 ha), operated by New Hampshire Audubon
McLane Center	Concord	Merrimack	Merrimack Valley	website, 20 acres (8.1 ha), headquarters of New Hampshire Audubon
Nature Discovery Center	Warner	Merrimack	Merrimack Valley	website, rocks, minerals, fossils, sea life, insects, Indian artifacts, mounted birds and mammals, interpretive trails (formerly located in Hopkinton and known as the Little Nature Museum)
Newfound Audubon Center	Hebron	Grafton	Lakes	website, operated by New Hampshire Audubon, located on Newfound Lake; comprises the Paradise Point Nature Center (open in summer), Ash Cottage at Hebron Marsh Sanctuary and the Bear Mountain Sanctuary
Peabody Mill Environmental Center	Amherst	Hillsborough	Merrimack Valley	website, operated by town of Amherst, abuts almost 600 acres (240 ha) of the Joe English Reservation
Prescott Farm Environmental Education Center	Laconia	Belknap	Lakes	website, 160 acres (65 ha), features 3 miles (5 km) of trails, historic barn, heritage gardens, and an old-fashioned maple sugar operation
Seabrook Station's Science & Nature Center	Seabrook	Rockingham	Seacoast	website, located at the Seabrook Station Nuclear Power Plant, exhibits about nuclear energy and electricity, marine touch pool, nature trail
Seacoast Science Center	Rye	Rockingham	Seacoast	Located in 135-acre (55 ha) Odiorne Point State Park, marine life and science
Squam Lakes Natural Science Center	Holderness	Grafton	Lakes	180 acres (73 ha), environmental education center and accredited zoo
Tin Mountain Conservation Center	Albany	Carroll	Lakes	website, programs at Nature Learning Center and at the 228-acre Tin Mountain Field Station in Jackson, NH
