= List of historical societies in New Hampshire =

The following is a list of historical societies in the state of New Hampshire, United States.

== Organizations ==
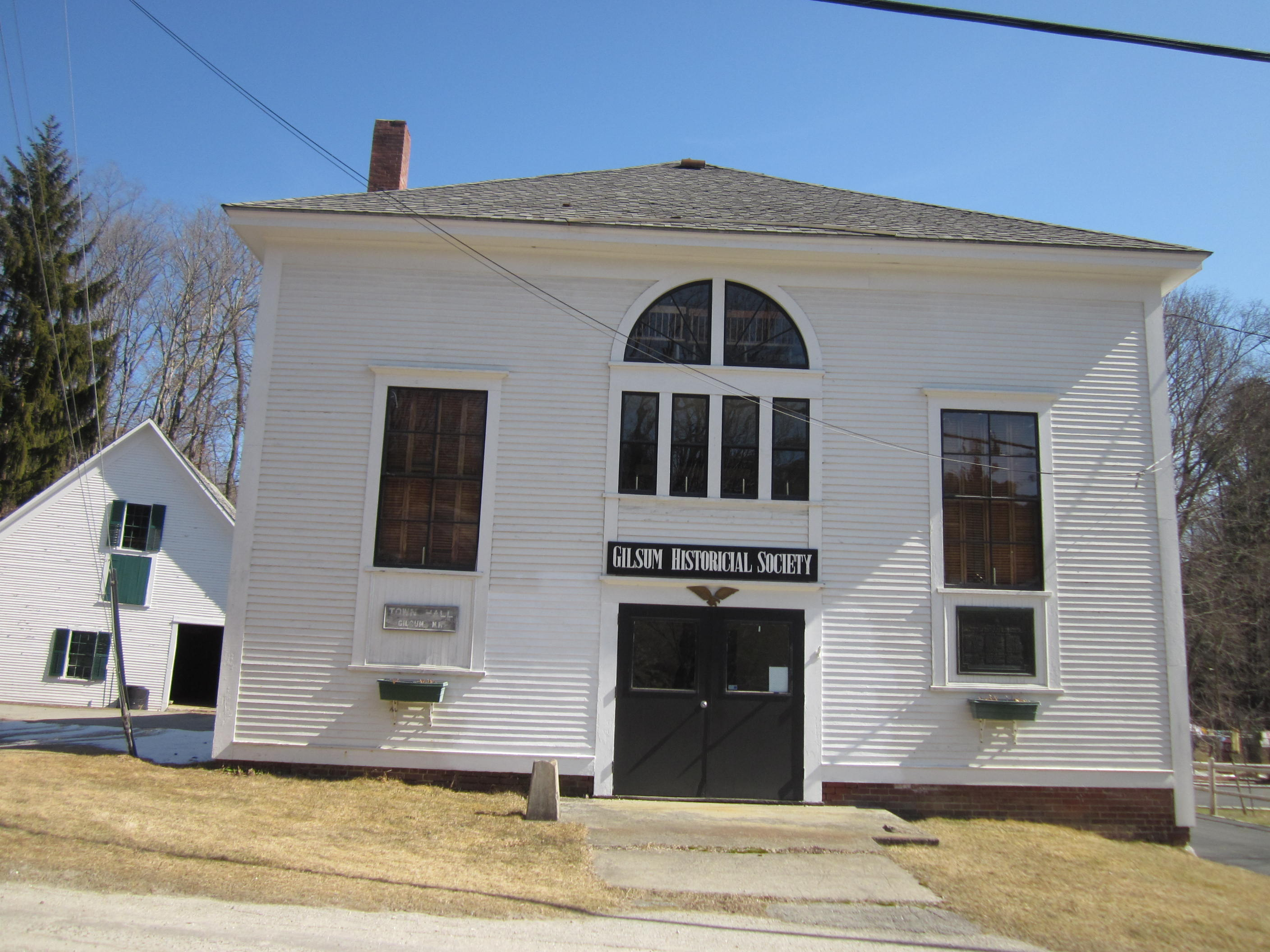
Gilsum Historical Society building in New Hampshire (photo 2012)

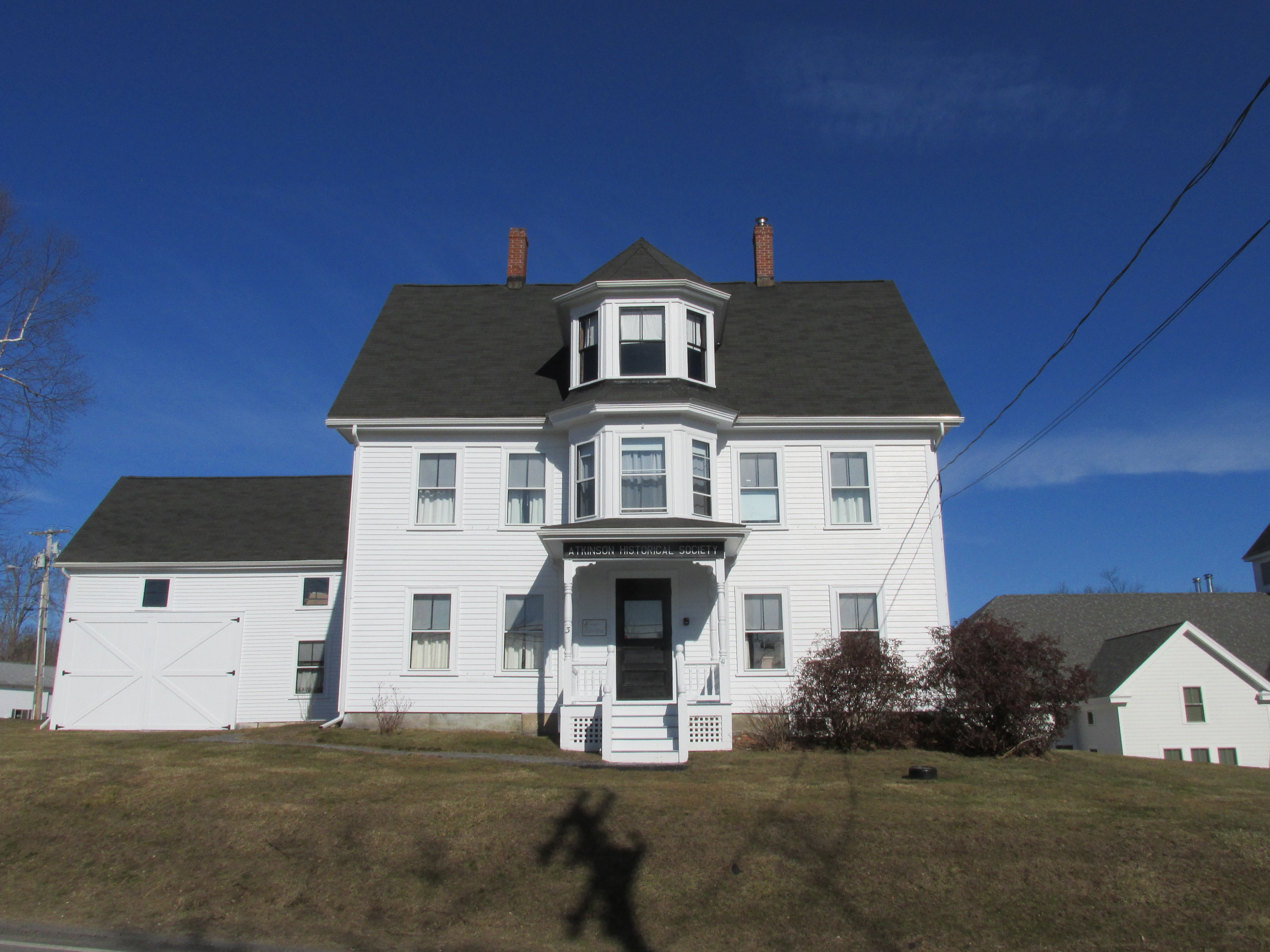
Atkinson Historical Society building in New Hampshire (photo 2013)

- Abbot-Downing Historical Society
- Acworth Historical Society
- Albany Historical Society
- Alexandria Historical Society
- Allenstown Historical Society
- Alstead Historical Society
- Alton Historical Society
- Andover Historical Society
- Antrim Historical Society
- Ashland Historical Society
- Association for Rollinsford Culture & History
- Atkinson Historical Society
- Auburn Historical Association
- Barnstead Historical Society
- Barrington Historical Society
- Bartlett Historical Society
- Bath Historical Society
- Bedford Historical Society
- Belknap Mill Society
- Belmont Historical Society
- Bennington Historical Society
- Berlin & Coos County Historical Society
- Boscawen Historical Society
- Bradford Historical Society
- Brentwood Historical Society
- Bridgewater Historical Society
- Campton Historical Society
- Canaan Historical Society
- Canterbury Historical Society
- Centre Harbor Historical Society
- Charlestown Historical Society
- Chatham Historical Society
- Chester Historical Society
- Chesterfield Historical Society
- Claremont Historical Society
- Cohos Historical Society
- Colebrook Area Historical Society
- Concord Historical Society
- Conway Historical Society
- Cornish Historical Society
- Croydon Historical Society
- Dalton Historical Society
- Danbury Historical Society
- Deerfield Historical Society
- Deering Historical Society
- Dublin Historical Society
- Dummer Historical Society
- Dunbarton Historical Society
- Durham Historic Association
- East Kingston Historical Society
- Effingham Historical Society
- Enfield Historical Society
- Epping Historical Society
- Exeter Historical Society
- Farmington Historical Society
- Fitzwilliam Historical Society Inc.
- Fort at #4 Association
- Francestown Improvement & Historical Society
- Franklin Historical Society
- Freedom Historical Society
- Friends of Kingston Historical Museum Association
- Friends of Pisgah, Inc.
- Gilmanton Historical Society
- Gilsum Historical Society
- Goffstown Historical Society
- Gorham Historical Society and Railroad Museum
- Goshen Historical Society
- Grantham Historical Society
- Greenfield Historical Society
- Greenland Historical Society
- Groton Historical Society, New Hampshire
- Hampstead Historical Society
- Hampton Falls Historical Society
- Hampton Historical Society
- Hancock Historical Society
- Hanover Historical Society
- Haverhill Historical Society
- Henniker Historical Society
- Hill Historical Society
- Hillsborough Historical Society
- Hinsdale Historical Society
- Historic Harrisville, Inc.
- Historical Society of Amherst
- Historical Society of Cheshire County
- Historical Society of Cheshire Cty
- Historical Society of Kensington
- Historical Society of Temple
- Holderness Historical Society
- Hollis Historical Society
- Hopkinton Historical Society
- Hudson Historical Society
- Isles of Shoals Historical & Research Association
- Jackson Historical Society
- Jaffrey Center Village Improvement Society
- Jaffrey Historical Society
- Jefferson Historical Society
- Johns Historical Hotel
- Keene Historical Society
- Kingston Improvement & Historical Society
- Laconia Historical & Museum Society
- Laconia Indian Historical Association
- Lake Winnipesaukee Historical Society
- Lakes Region Heritage Roundtable
- Lancaster Historical Society
- Lebanon Historical Society
- Lee Historical Society
- Lempster Historical Society
- Lisbon Area Historical Society
- Littleton Area Historical Society
- Londonderry Historical Society
- Loudon Historical Society
- Madbury Historical Society
- Madison Historical Society
- Manchester Historic Association
- Marlborough Historical Society
- Marlow Historical Society
- Meredith Historical Society
- Merrimack Historical Society
- Merrimack Society of Genealogists
- Milford Historical Society
- Monadnock Center for History and Culture
- Moultonborough Historical Society
- Nashua Historical Society
- Natural History Conference
- New Boston Historical Society
- New Castle Historical Society, New Hampshire
- New Durham Historical Society
- New Hampshire Historical Society
- New Hampshire Sled Dog Rescue History and Education Center
- New Hampshire Society of Genealogists
- New Hampshire Supreme Courthistorical Society
- New Hampton Historical Society
- New Ipswich Historical Society
- New London Historical Society
- Newbury Historical Society
- Newington Historical Society
- Newport Historical Society, New Hampshire
- Newton Historical Society
- North Hampton Historical Society
- Northumberland Historical Society
- Northwood Historical Society
- Nottingham Historical Society
- Orford Historical Society
- Ossipee Historical Society
- Park Hill Meeting House Society
- Pelham Historical Society
- Pembroke Historical Society
- Penacook Historical Society
- Pequawaket Historical League
- Piermont Historical Society
- Pittsburg Historical Society
- Pittsfield Historical Society
- Plainfield Historical Society
- Plaistow Historical Society
- Plymouth Historical Society
- Poore Family Farm Foundation
- Portsmouth Historical Society, New Hampshire
- Racing History Preservation Group
- Raymond Historical Society
- Richmond Historical Society
- Rindge Historical Society
- Rochester Historical Society
- Rockingham County Society of Genealogists
- Rollinsford Historical Society
- Rumney Historical Society
- Rye Historical Society
- Salem Historical Society
- Salisbury Historical Society
- Sanbornton Historical Document Foundation
- Sanbornton Historical Society
- Sandown Historical Society and Museum
- Sandwich Historical Society
- Shelburne Heritage Commission
- Springfield Historical Society
- Stoddard Historical Society
- Strafford County Genealogical Society
- Strafford Historical Society
- Sugar Hill Historical Museum
- Sugar Hill Historical Society
- Summersworth Historical Society
- Sunapee Historical Society
- Surry Historical Committee
- Sutton Historical Society
- Swanzey Historical Museum
- Tamworth Historical Society
- Thompson Ames Historical Society
- Thornton Historical Society
- Township of Grafton Historical Society
- Township of Milton Historical Society
- Troy Historical Society
- Tuftonboro Historical Society
- Twin Mountain-Bretton Woods Historical Society
- Unity Historical Society
- Upper Pemigewasset Historical Society
- Village Improvement and Red Schoolhouse Historical Society
- Wakefield Heritage Commission
- Wakefield-Brookfield Historical Society
- Walpole Historical Society
- Warner Historical Society
- Warren Historical Society
- Washington Historical Society
- Waterville Valley Historical Society
- Weare Historical Society
- Wentworth Historical Society
- Westmoreland Historical Society
- Whitefield Historical Society
- Wilmot Historical Society
- Wilton Historical Society
- Winchester Historical Society
- Wolfeboro Historical Society

== See also ==
- History of New Hampshire
- List of museums in New Hampshire
- National Register of Historic Places listings in New Hampshire
- List of historical societies in the United States
