= Evelyn Browne =

Evelyn Browne (1915 – 1994) was an American environmentalist and professor of outdoor education at the University of New Hampshire (UNH).

In the early 1970s, Browne was influential in stopping shipping magnate Aristotle Onassis from building an oil refinery on Great Bay in New Hampshire. Onassis offered to purchase Browne's land in order to create a nature sanctuary, and entered into negotiations to buy the land. When it was discovered that his real intention was to build an oil refinery, Evelyn began helping organize and leading Save Our Shores, an organization that eventually stopped the Onassis plan. Browne was able to nullify the sale of her property, and thus prevented the refinery from being built. Later, she helped establish the Great Bay National Estuarine Research Reserve.

In 1987, Browne donated land to UNH for the establishment of a center for outdoor education. It is now known as the Browne Center, in honor of her work as an educator and advocate for environmental preservation.
