= Hazen-Spiller House =

Historic house in Massachusetts, United States

- U.S. National Register of Historic Places
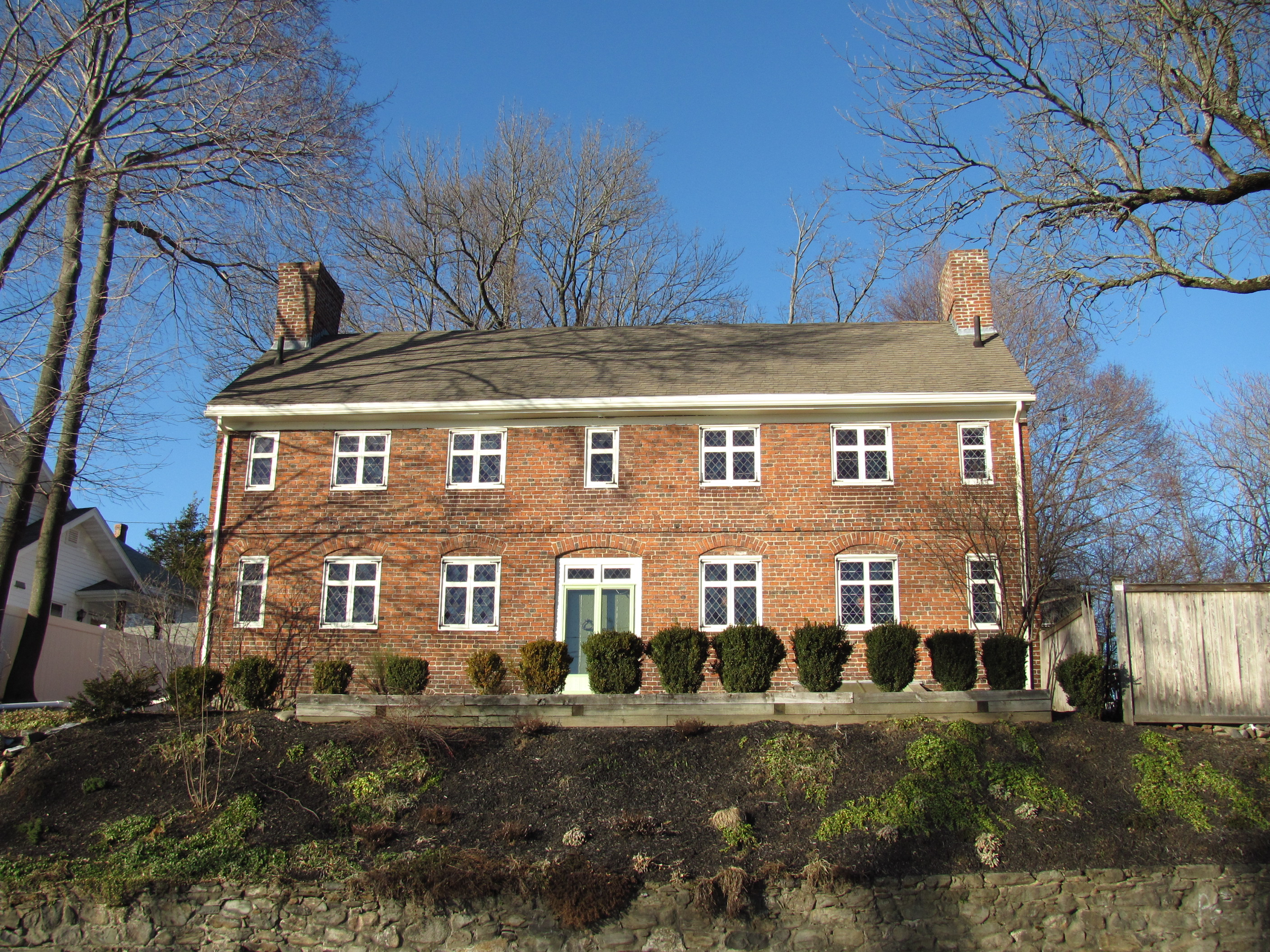
- Hazen-Spiller House

- Location within Massachusetts Location within the United States
- Location: 8 Groveland Street, Haverhill, Massachusetts
- Coordinates: 42°47′51″N 71°1′4″W
- Built: 1724
- Architectural style: Colonial
- MPS: First Period Buildings of Eastern Massachusetts TR
- NRHP reference No.: 90000226
- Added to NRHP: March 9, 1990

The Hazen-Spiller House is a historic late First Period house in Haverhill, Massachusetts. Built c. 1724 by Richard Hazen, It is a rare example of a brick house of the time, and notable for its role in early 20th century restoration activities. The 2 1/2-story building is made of brick laid in English bond, with end chimneys and a central hall layout. The house was acquired in 1911 by early preservationist William Taylor, who took notes detailing the buildings First Period features. In 1915 Taylor sold the house to Wallace Nutting, who undertook a "restoration" that covered over some of those features and may have destroyed others. The house was one of a series owned by Nutting and showcased in a guidebook, Chain of Picture Houses, he used to popularized colonial styles.

The house was listed on the National Register of Historic Places in 1990.

== See also ==
- National Register of Historic Places listings in Essex County, Massachusetts
