= National Register of Historic Places listings in New Hampshire =

Density of distribution of listings in New Hampshire in January 2025.

This is a directory of properties and districts listed on the National Register of Historic Places in New Hampshire. There are more than 800 listed sites in New Hampshire. Each of the 10 counties in New Hampshire has at least 30 listings on the National Register.

Contents: Counties in New Hampshire
Belknap - Carroll - Cheshire - Coös - Grafton - Hillsborough - Merrimack - Rockingham - Strafford - Sullivan

This National Park Service list is complete through NPS recent listings posted September 25, 2026.

== Current listings by county ==
The following are approximate tallies of current listings by county. These counts are based on entries in the National Register Information Database as of April 24, 2008, and new weekly listings posted since then on the National Register of Historic Places web site. There are frequent additions to the listings and occasional delistings, thus the counts here are approximate and not official. New entries are added to the official Register on a weekly basis. Also, the counts in this table exclude boundary increase and decrease listings which modify the area covered by an existing property or district and which carry a separate National Register reference number. The numbers of NRHP listings in each county are documented by tables in each of the individual county list-articles.

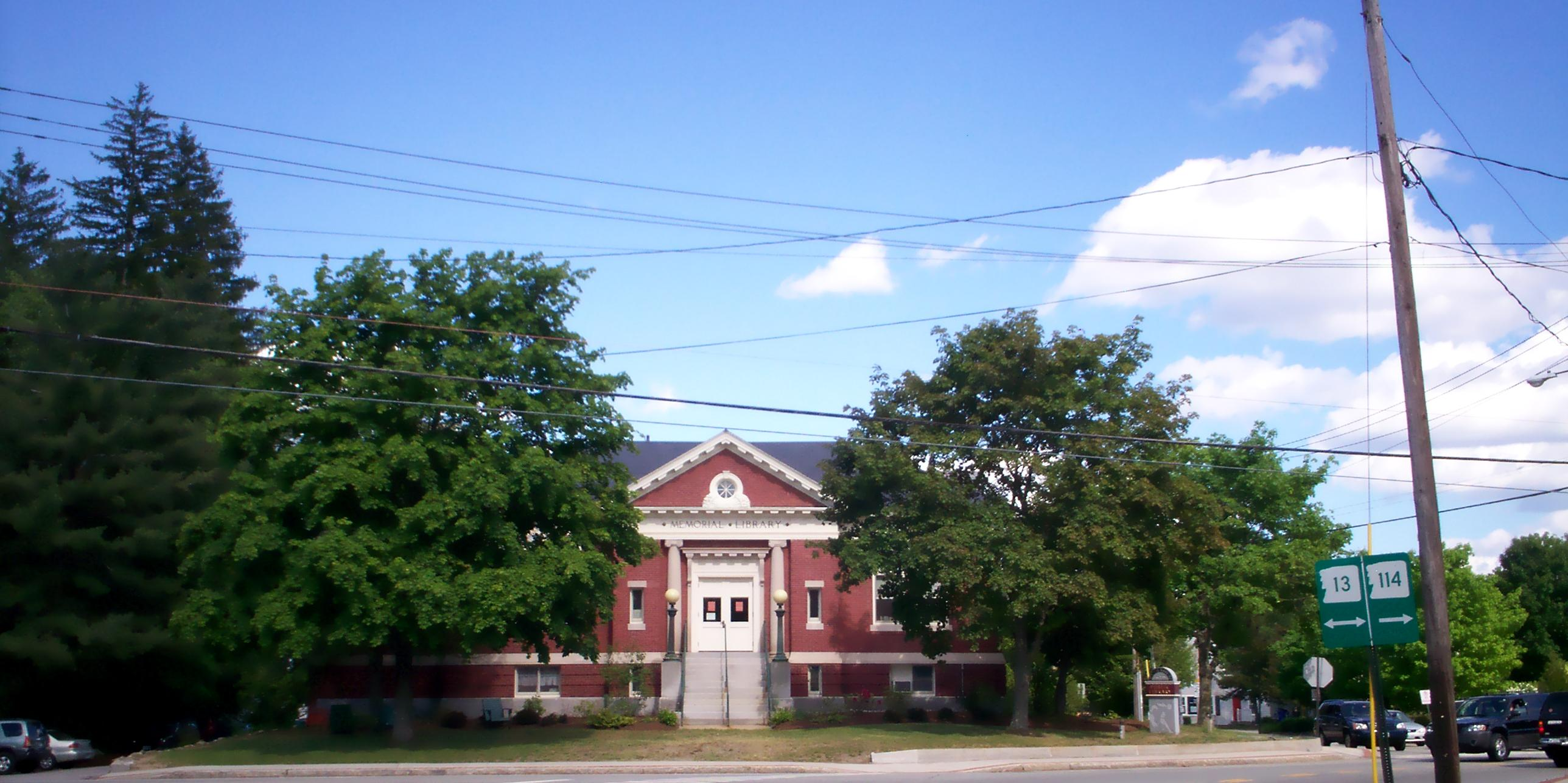
Goffstown Public Library

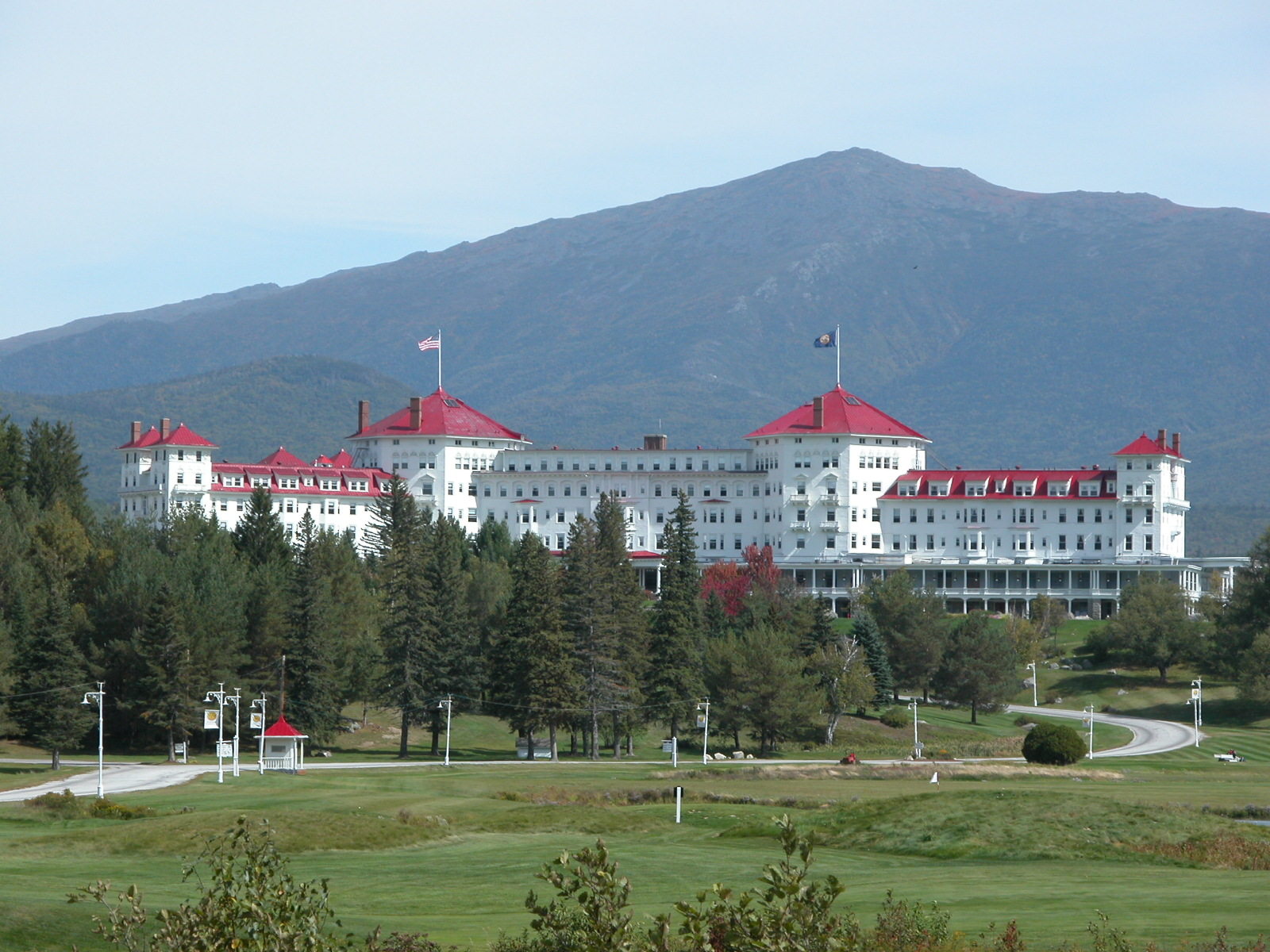
Mount Washington Hotel

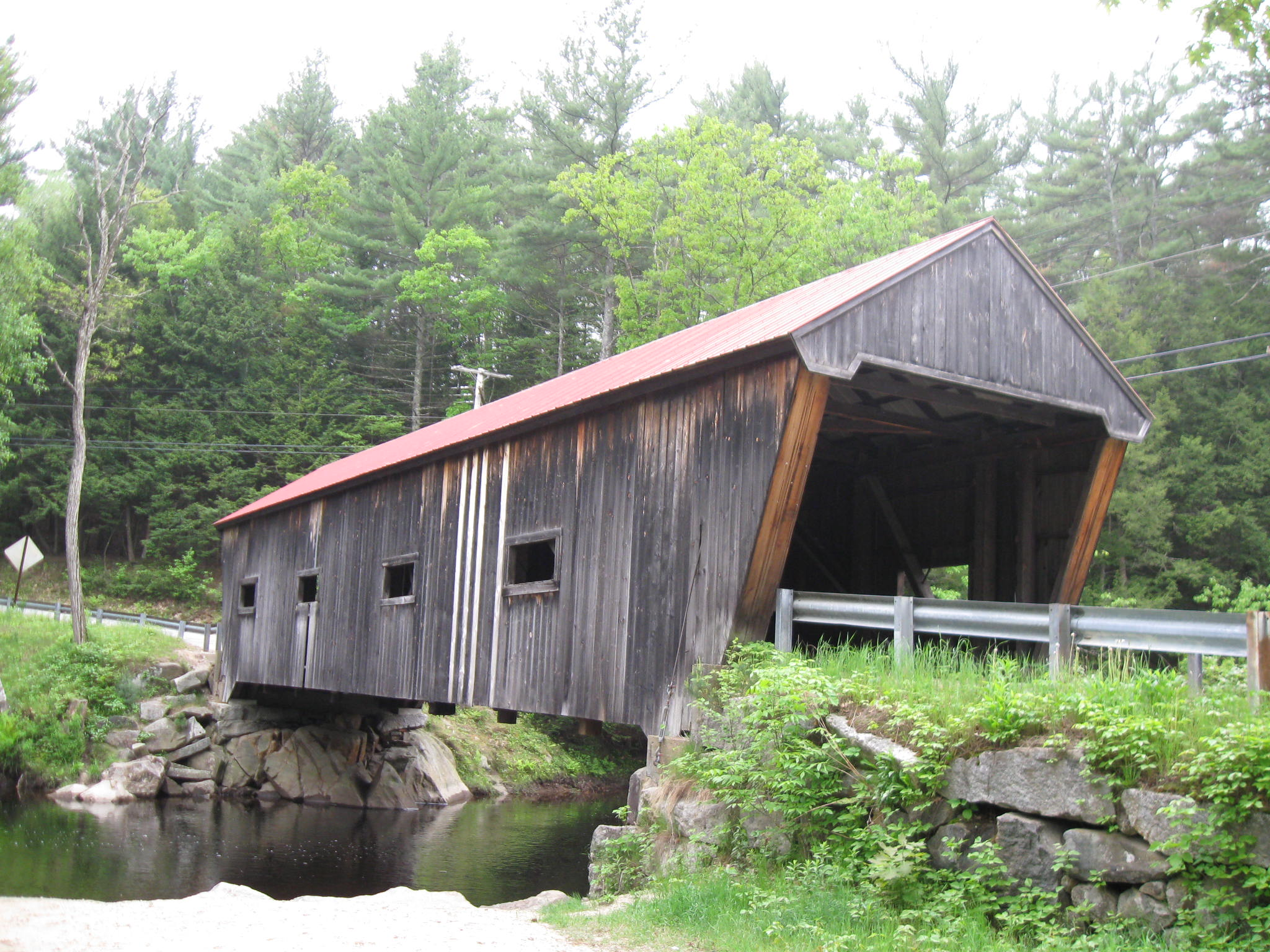
Dalton Covered Bridge

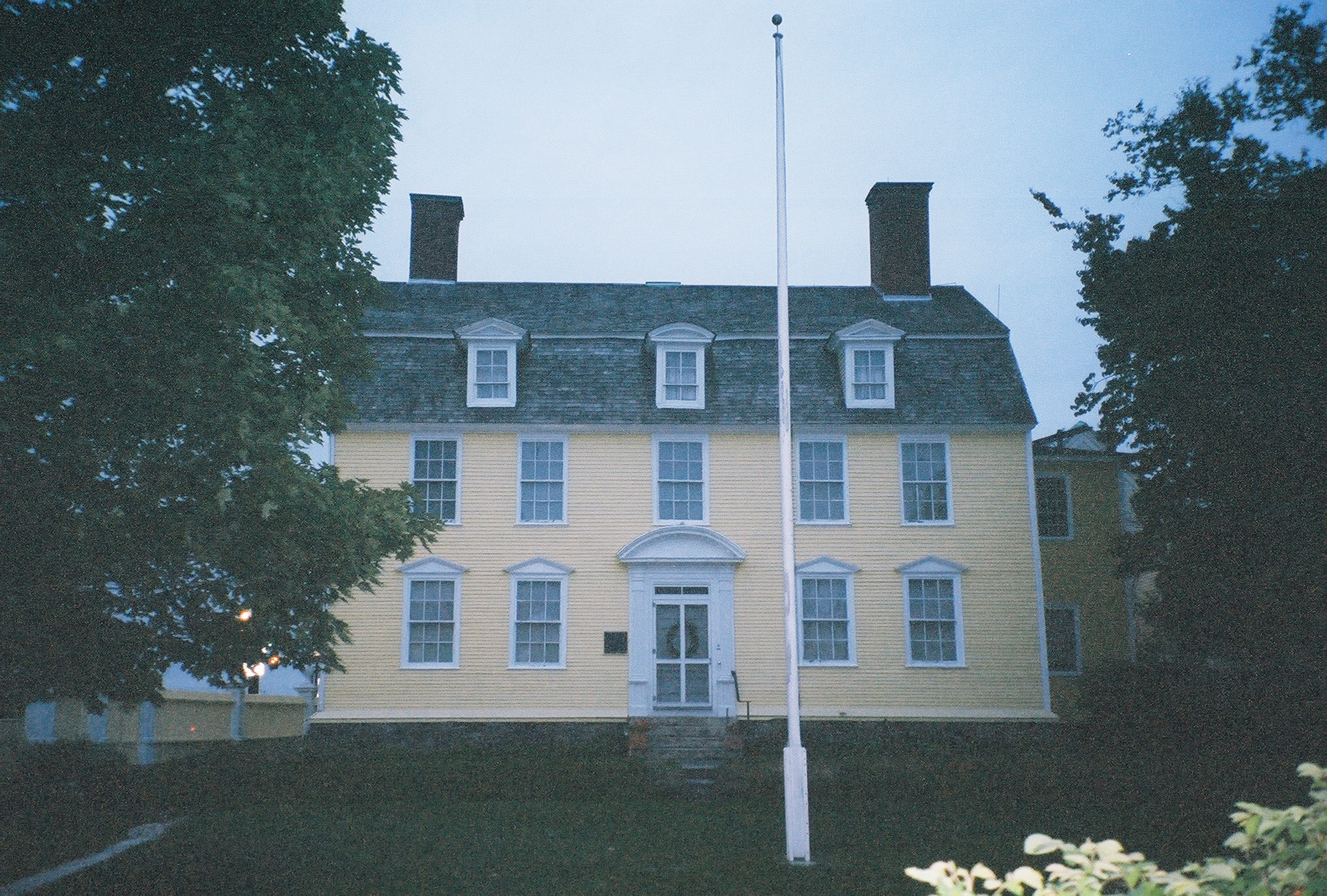
John Paul Jones House

	County	# of Sites
1	Belknap	48
2	Carroll	61
3	Cheshire	156
4	Coös	33
5	Grafton	80
6	Hillsborough	112
7	Merrimack	88
8	Rockingham	134
9	Strafford	45
10	Sullivan	68
(duplicates)		0
TOTAL		825

== See also ==
- List of bridges on the National Register of Historic Places in New Hampshire
- List of historical societies in New Hampshire
- List of National Historic Landmarks in New Hampshire
- New Hampshire State Register of Historic Places
