= Wentworth Lear Historic Houses =

Historic houses in New Hampshire, United States

- Wentworth-Gardner and Tobias Lear Houses
- U.S. National Register of Historic Places
- U.S. Historic district
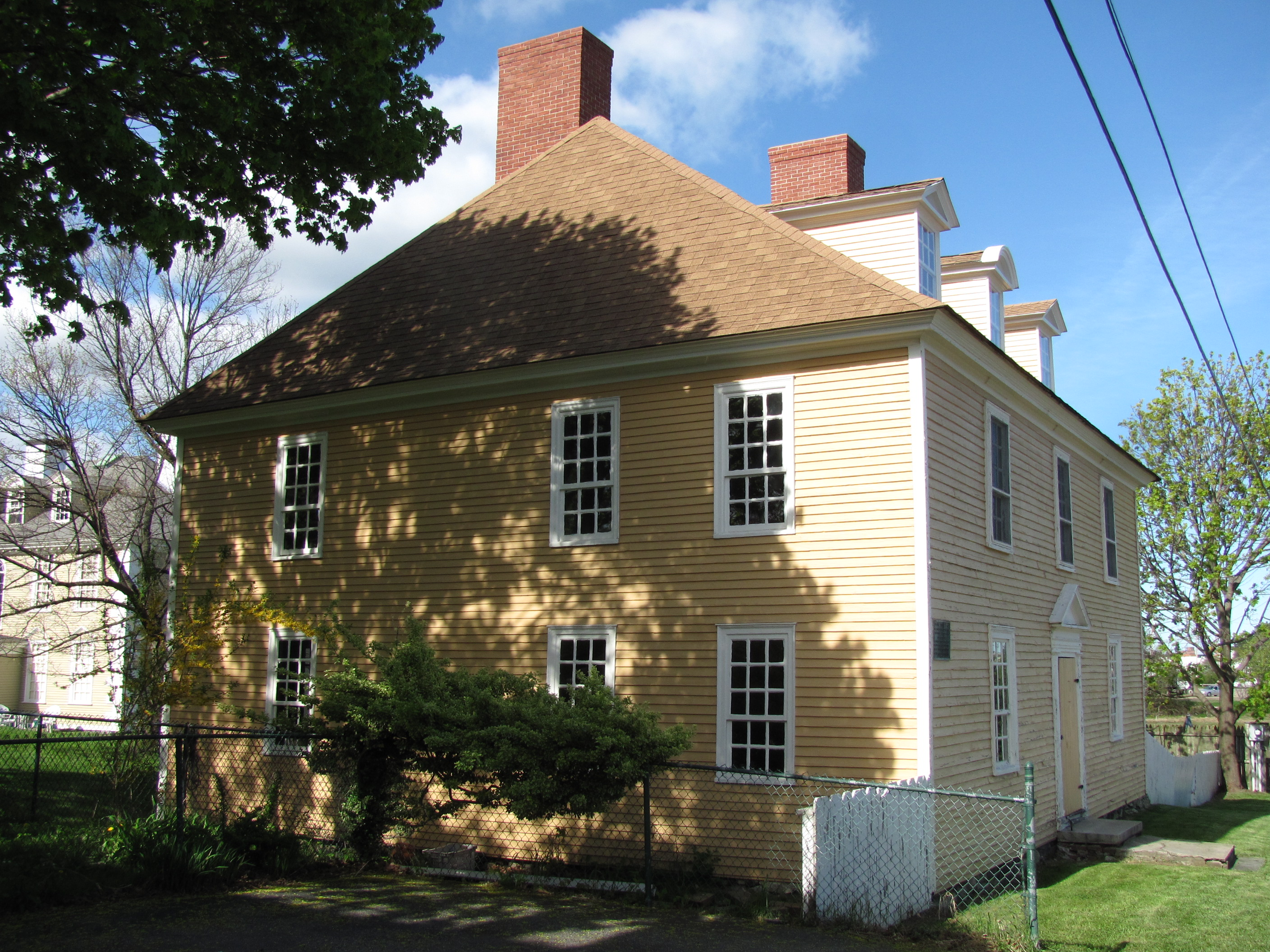
- Tobias Lear House

- Location within New Hampshire Location within the United States
- Location: 50 Mechanic Street, Portsmouth, New Hampshire
- Coordinates: 43°4′27.52″N 70°45′0.07″W
- Built: 1760
- Architectural style: Georgian
- NRHP reference No.: 79000319
- Added to NRHP: October 30, 1979

The Wentworth Lear Historic Houses (formerly Wentworth-Gardner & Tobias Lear Historic House Association) are a pair of adjacent historic houses on the south waterfront in Portsmouth, New Hampshire. Both buildings and an 18th-century warehouse were owned by the Wentworth Lear Historic Houses and were operated as a house museum. Only the Wentworth-Gardner house is a museum. They are located at the corner of Mechanic and Gardner Streets. The two houses, built c. 1750–60, represent a study in contrast between high-style and vernacular Georgian styling. The Wentworth-Gardner House is a National Historic Landmark, and the houses are listed as the Wentworth-Gardner and Tobias Lear Houses on the National Register of Historic Places.

== Tobias Lear House ==
The Tobias Lear House is a 2 1/2-story wood-frame structure built c. 1750. It has clapboard siding, a hip roof with pedimented gable-roof dormers, and interior chimneys. Its main facade is three bays wide, with a central entry framed by pilasters and topped by a triangular pediment. The house has only modest woodwork detailing, both on its inside and outside.

The house was built by Tobias Lear, a merchant and ship's captain. His son, also named Tobias Lear, was private secretary to President George Washington, and hosted Washington in this house during his visit to Portsmouth in 1789. The house was sold out of the Lear family in 1861, and acquired in 1917 by architectural preservationist Wallace Nutting. It was later purchased by the Society for the Preservation of New England Antiquities (SPNEA, now Historic New England), who transferred it to its present owners in 1940. The Lear House was sold to a private owner who turned it into an Airbnb in 2021.

== Wentworth-Gardner House ==
In contrast to the Lear House's modest styling, the Wentworth-Gardner House exemplifies high-style Georgian architecture, and is further notable for the role it played in the early years of the architectural preservation movement. This 2 1/2-story wood-frame house was built in 1760 by Mark Hunking Wentworth, one of New Hampshire's wealthiest merchants and landowners, as a wedding present for his son Thomas. The exterior of its main facade is flushboarded with corner quoining, giving it the appearance of masonry construction. The side walls, and those of the rear ell, are clapboarded. The main facade is five bays wide, with its center entry framed by a Colonial Revival surround added during restoration in 1916–18 by Wallace Nutting. It has a hip roof, with a modillioned cornice. Three dormers pierce each of the front and rear elevations, with the central dormer featuring a segmented-arch pediment, while the flanking ones have triangular pediments. The interior is richly decorated with woodwork, particularly in the central hall and the public rooms.

Wallace Nutting purchased the house in 1916, and undertook its restoration. In 1918 he sold it to the Metropolitan Museum of Art, which considered moving it to New York City for display, but this plan was abandoned in favor of in situ preservation. The house was administered by SPNEA until it was turned over to the present owner in 1940. The house was declared a National Historic Landmark in 1968.

== Museum ==
The Wentworth-Gardner Mansion is open for tours Thursday-Monday between June and October; admission is charged, which includes the mansion and the 18th-century warehouse. The museum is also available for wedding & special occasion photography.

== See also ==
- National Register of Historic Places listings in Rockingham County, New Hampshire
