= Wentworth-Gardner House =

Historic house in New Hampshire, United States

- U.S. National Register of Historic Places
- U.S. National Historic Landmark
- U.S. Historic district – Contributing property
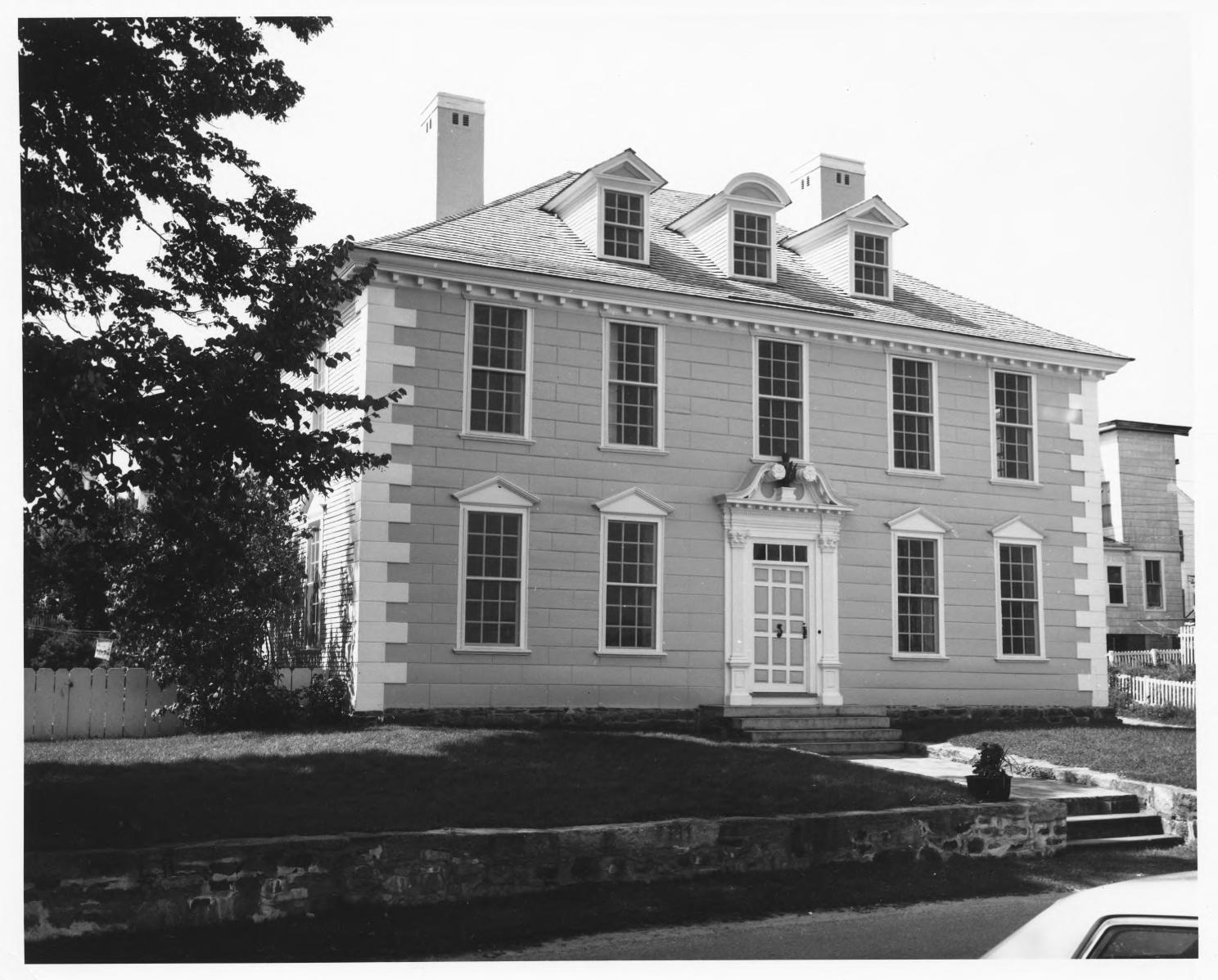
- 1967 photograph

- Location within New Hampshire Location within the United States
- Location: 140 Mechanic Street, Portsmouth, New Hampshire
- Coordinates: 43°3′42″N 70°44′20″W
- Built: 1760
- Architectural style: Georgian
- Part of: Wentworth-Gardner and Tobias Lear Houses (ID79000319)
- NRHP reference No.: 68000012

Significant dates
- Added to NRHP: November 24, 1968
- Designated NHL: November 24, 1968
- Designated CP: October 30, 1979

The Wentworth-Gardner House is a historic mid-Georgian house built in 1760 and located at 50 Mechanic Street in Portsmouth, New Hampshire, United States. The house is operated as a museum by the Wentworth-Gardner Historic House Association. It is one of the finest extant examples of high-style Georgian architecture in New England, and played a role in the architectural preservation movement of the early 20th century. It was declared a National Historic Landmark in 1968.

== Description and history ==
The Wentworth-Gardner House is a 2 1/2-story wood-frame house that was built in 1760 by Mark Hunking Wentworth, one of New Hampshire's wealthiest merchants and landowners, as a wedding present for his son Thomas. The exterior of its main facade is flushboarded with corner quoining, giving it the appearance of masonry construction. The side walls, and those of the rear ell, are clapboarded. The main facade is five bays wide, with its center entry framed by a Colonial Revival surround added during restoration in 1916–18 by Wallace Nutting. It has a hip roof, with a modillioned cornice. Three dormers pierce each of the front and rear elevations, with the central dormer featuring a segmented-arch pediment, while the flanking ones have triangular pediments.

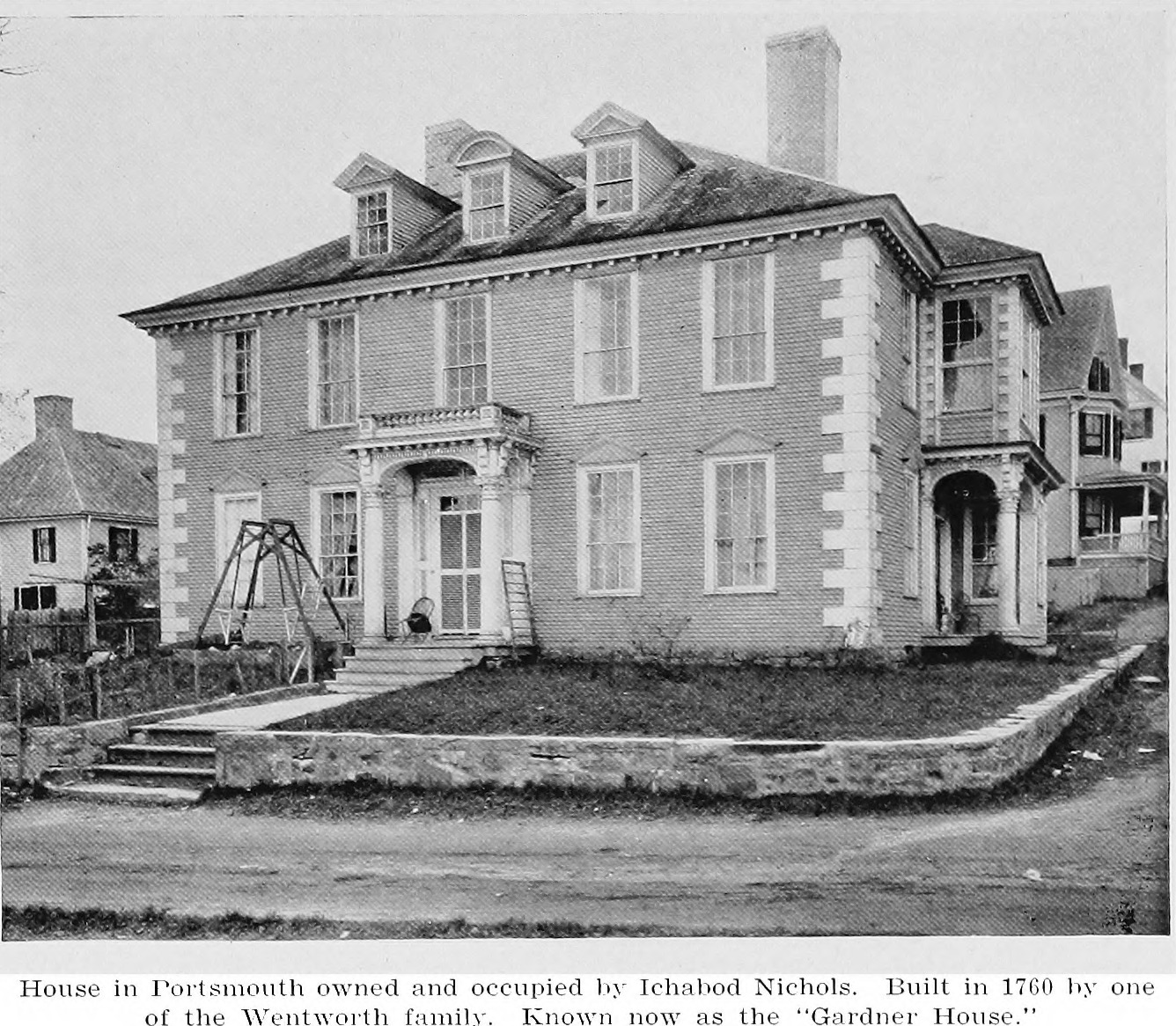
Circa 1921

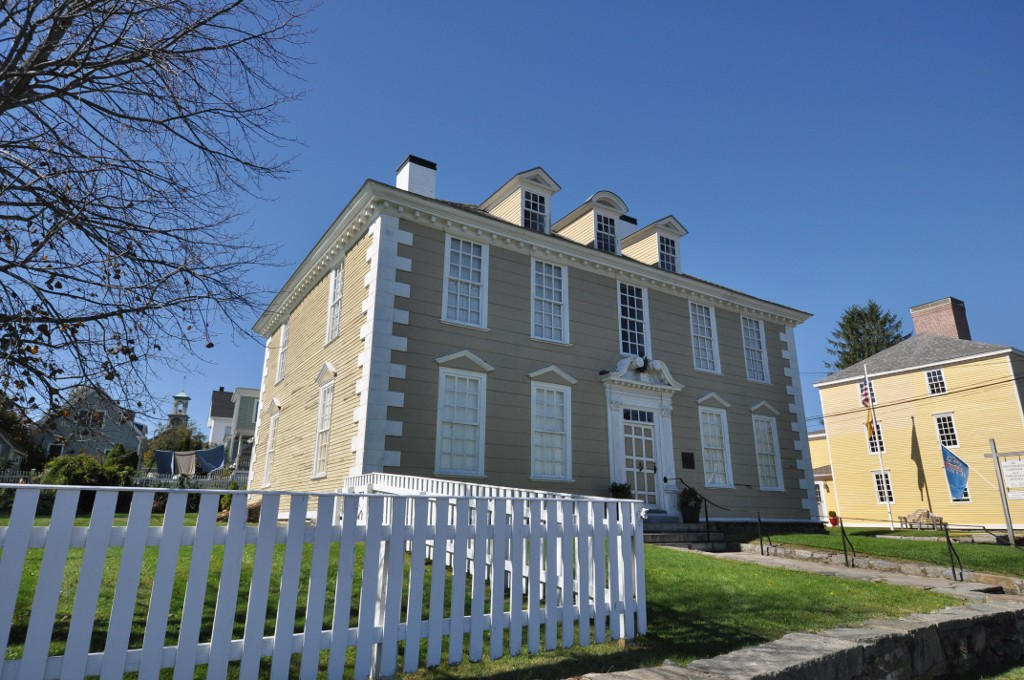
The house in 2013

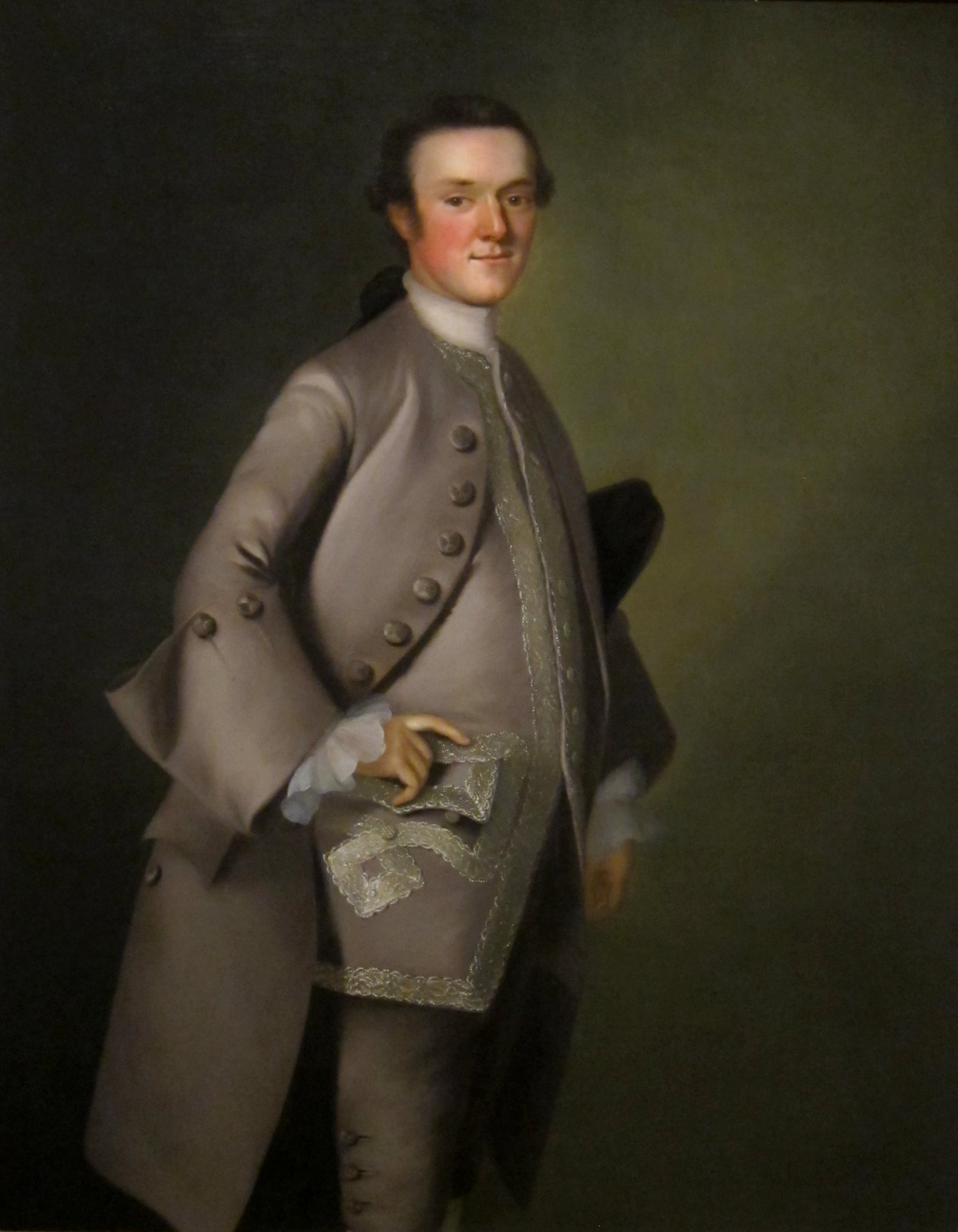
Portrait of Thomas Wentworth by Joseph Blackburn

The interior of the house follows a typical Georgian central-hall plan, with four rooms on each floor, two on either side of the central hall, all having access to one of the two interior chimneys. The hall is particularly broad and elegant, featuring an elliptical arch with keystone, supported by Doric columns. The cornice is particularly elaborate, with modillions and egg-and-dart molding. The stairs rise on the left-hand side, with elaborate turned balusters, and panelled and scrolled step ends. The upper hall continues the rich decorative woodwork found in the lower hall, with Ionic pilasters and a molded architrave.

The southeast front parlor is the finest room in the house, with a fireplace surround highlighted by full-height Corinthian pilasters and a wooden entablature. All of the downstairs rooms have detailed woodwork in the cornice, panelled folding shutters that can be recessed into deep window jambs, and tile surrounding the fireplace.

The dining room, located on the first floor in the southwest corner of the house, contains circa 1818 handblocked wallpaper from the Joseph DuFour Company in Paris, France. This wallpaper depicts a Greek festival called La Festival Grecque. The wallpaper is not original to the house, and was installed by Wallace Nutting during his renovations.

Wallace Nutting, an antiquarian, purchased the house in 1916, and undertook its restoration. In 1918 he sold it to the Metropolitan Museum of Art, which considered moving it to New York City for display, but this plan was eventually abandoned in favor of in situ preservation. The house was administered by the Society for the Preservation of New England Antiquities (SPNEA, now Historic New England) until it was turned over to the present owner in 1940.

The house was declared a National Historic Landmark in 1968.

The home's first resident, Thomas Wentworth, received the house as a wedding present from his parents when he married Anne Tasker, who was from Marblehead, Massachusetts. Thomas received his degree from Harvard in 1761 and made his living as a merchant like his father. Only a few years after moving into the house, Thomas died of an illness in 1768, leaving behind his wife and five children.

== Museum ==
This house is normally open for tours Thursday-Monday between mid-June and mid-October; admission is charged. The Wentworth-Gardner House is available for wedding photography.

== See also ==
- Wentworth Lear Historic Houses
- List of National Historic Landmarks in New Hampshire
- National Register of Historic Places listings in Rockingham County, New Hampshire
