= Wallace Nutting =

American photographer and furniture maker (1861–1941)

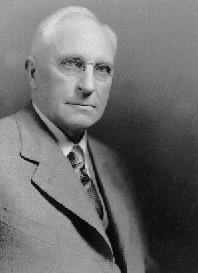
- Born: November 17, 1861; Rock Bottom, Massachusetts, US
- Died: July 19, 1941 (aged 79); Framingham, Massachusetts, US
- Known for: Colorized photographs of New England landscapes, reproduction antique furniture
- Movement: Colonial Revival

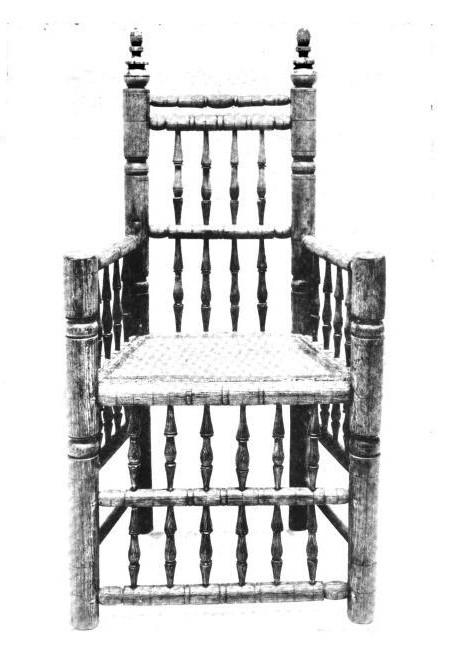
Nutting's 17th century Brewster Chair

Wallace Nutting (November 17, 1861 – July 19, 1941) was an American minister, photographer, artist, and antiquarian, who is most famous for his landscape photos of New England. He also was an accomplished author, lecturer, furniture maker, antiques expert and collector. His atmospheric photographs helped spur the Colonial Revival style.

== Early life ==
He was born in Rock Bottom, Massachusetts (a village straddling Stow and Hudson), on Sunday, November 17, 1861, the second child of Albion and Elizabeth Nutting. His father was killed in the Civil War.

The family was descended from John Nutting, who came from England in 1639 and was killed by Indians during a raid against Groton, Massachusetts. The Indians severed John Nutting's head and put it on a pole to discourage others from settling in the area.

== Education and personal life ==
Wallace Nutting graduated from high school in Augusta, Maine. He studied at Phillips Exeter Academy, Harvard University, Hartford Theological Seminary and Union Theological Seminary. He graduated from Harvard with the class of 1887. Nutting earned a Doctor of Divinity degree from Whitman College in 1893. He received an honorary doctor of Humanities from Washington & Jefferson College in 1938.

On June 5, 1888 he married Mariet Griswold in Buckland, Massachusetts. They had no children.

Nutting began his career as a Congregational minister in several towns including Minneapolis, Seattle, and Providence and Fryeburg, Maine, but he was forced to retire at age 43 because of poor health. He suffered from neurasthenia, and turned to bicycling as a means of relaxation and improving his health.

While in Providence, he read scripture at the funeral for Gorham Manufacturing Company Superintendent Charles Henry Baker at the Central Congregational Church.

== Work ==
=== Photography ===
It was on these bicycle rides in the countryside that Nutting started taking photographs. In 1904 he opened the Wallace Nutting Art Prints Studio on East 23rd Street in New York. After a year he moved his business to a farm in Southbury, Connecticut. He called this place "Nuttinghame". In 1912 he moved the photography studio to Framingham, Massachusetts, in a home he called "Nuttingholme". That year he published a catalog of prints that was 97 pages and included about 900 images. By 1915, Nutting claimed to be earning $1,000 per day.

Nutting's photographs ranged in subject and price to suit a variety of tastes. His catalog included pastoral scenes such as views of abbeys, cathedrals, bridges, mountains, flowers, and winding roads. One of his most common themes was "Colonials", which were photos of women in traditional 18th-Century roles. These were traditional pictures of femininity, usually pictured indoors in front of a chest, chair, or looking glass. His prints sold from $1.25 to $20.

Nutting authored several books about the scenic beauties of New England, the United Kingdom, and Ireland. In the peak of his business he employed about two-hundred colorists. By his own account, Wallace Nutting sold ten million pictures. Wallace Nutting's colorists painted the photographs which he took. These colorists would sometimes sign Wallace Nutting's name on the photos which is why the signatures vary.

=== Furniture ===
Nutting had a collection of furniture which he used as props in his "Colonial" photography. This experience led him to start a business manufacturing and selling reproduction furniture. His expertise in this field led him to author a guidebook to American Windsor furniture in 1917. By 1918 his mail-order catalog offered dozens of Windsor chairs in several historic styles.

== Death and legacy ==
Wallace Nutting died at his home at 24 Vernon St., Framingham, Massachusetts on Saturday, July 19, 1941, at age 79. His body was transported to Augusta, Maine for burial.

Nutting's residence in Portsmouth, New Hampshire is also known as the Wentworth-Gardner House. A Wallace Nutting Society exists for the study of his work.

Today, Nutting's furniture and photographs are widely collected.

== Gallery ==
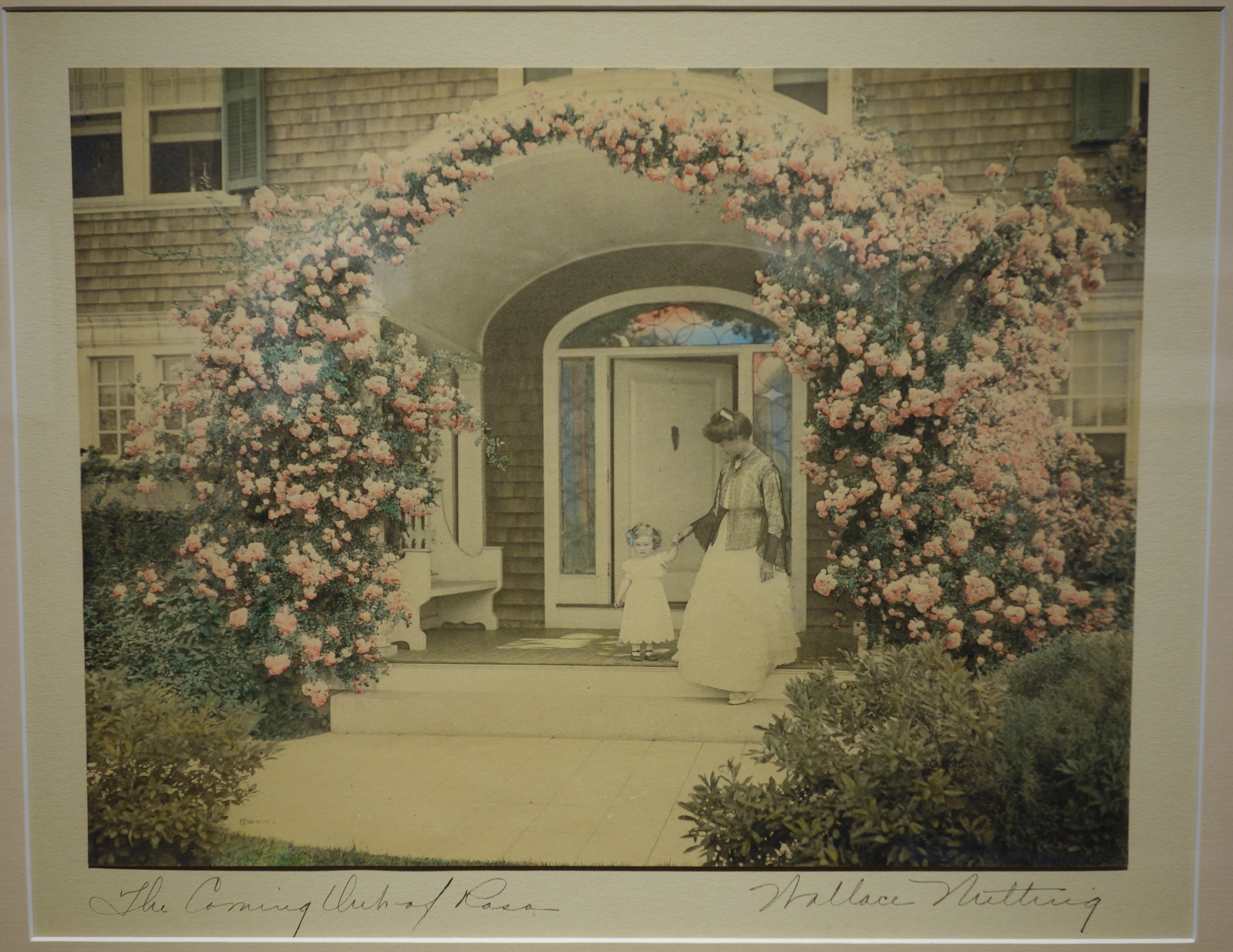

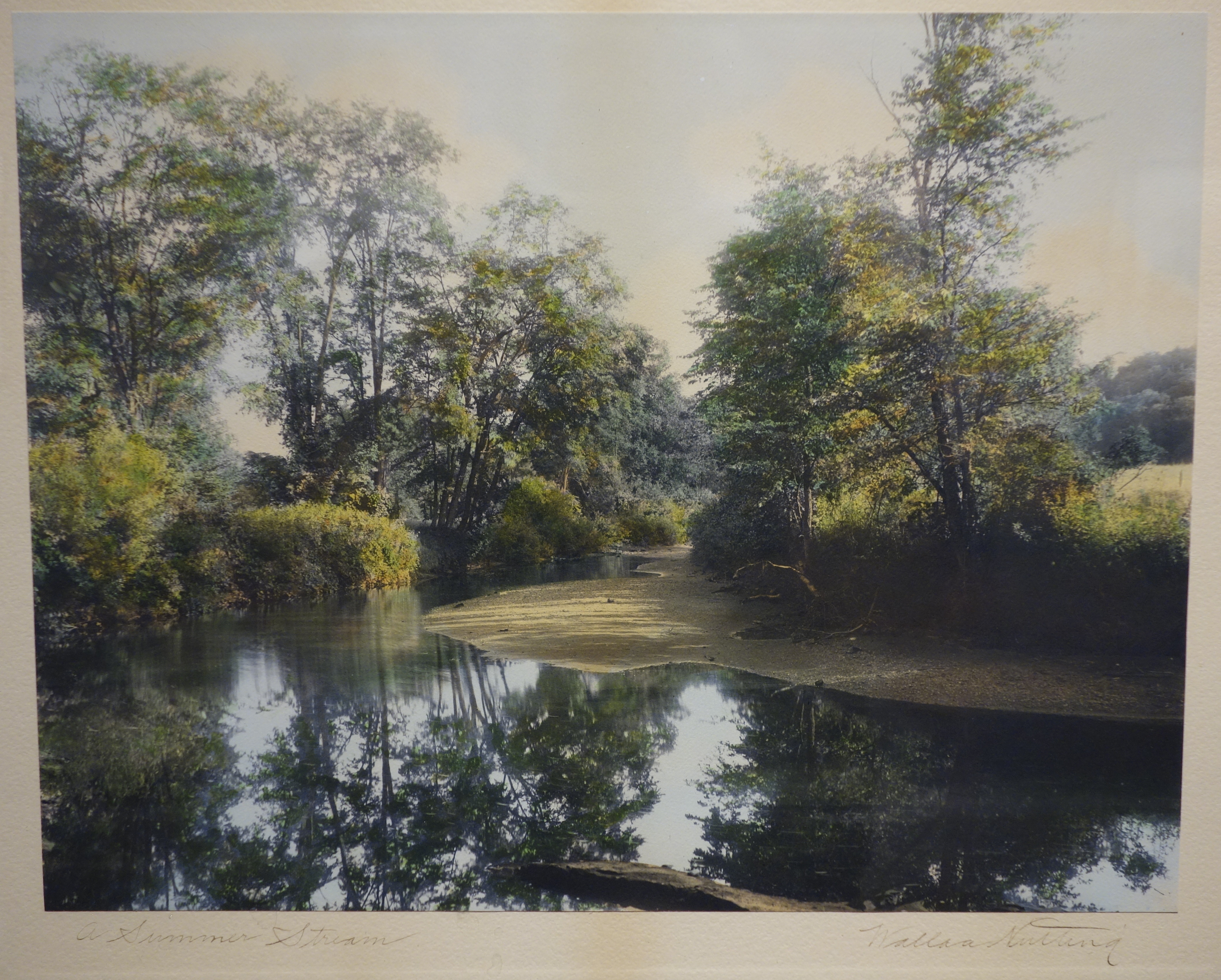

== See also ==
Houses owned and the subject of Nutting's preservation activities:

- Hazen-Spiller House
- Joseph Webb House
- Wentworth-Gardner House
- Iron Works House
