= New Hampshire Historical Society =

American historical organization

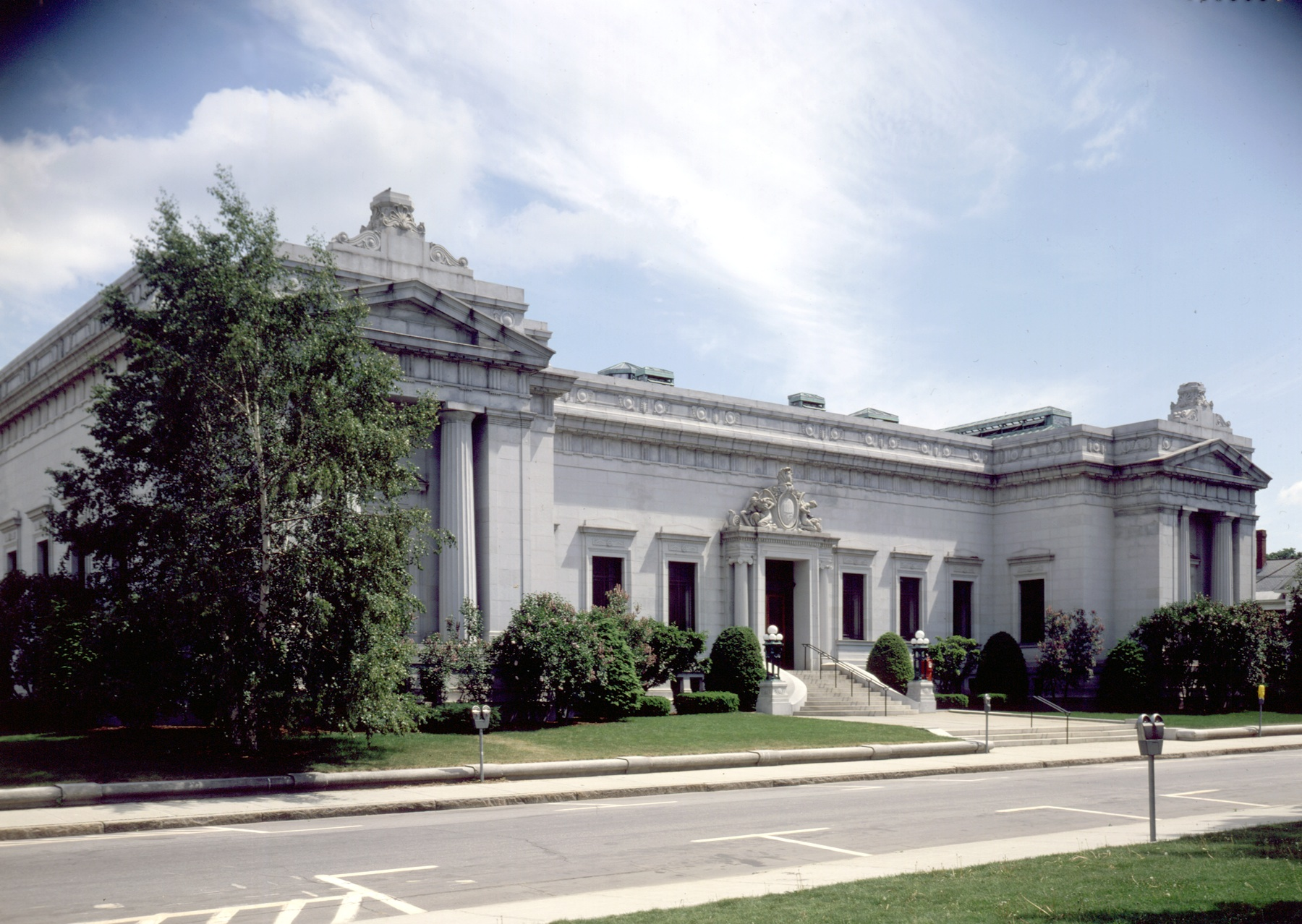
- The New Hampshire Historical Society's headquarters at 30 Park Street, Concord.
- Founded: 1823 (203 years ago)
- Type: Nonprofit
- Purpose: History of New Hampshire
- Location: Concord, New Hampshire, U.S.
- Coordinates: 43.20729°N 71.53951°W
- President: William H. Dunlap
- Publication: Historical New Hampshire
- Funding: Member dues and private contributions
- Staff: 12 (full time); 17 (part time)
- Website: nhhistory.org

The New Hampshire Historical Society is an independent nonprofit organization that saves, preserves, and shares the history of New Hampshire. The organization is headquartered in Concord, the capital city of New Hampshire.

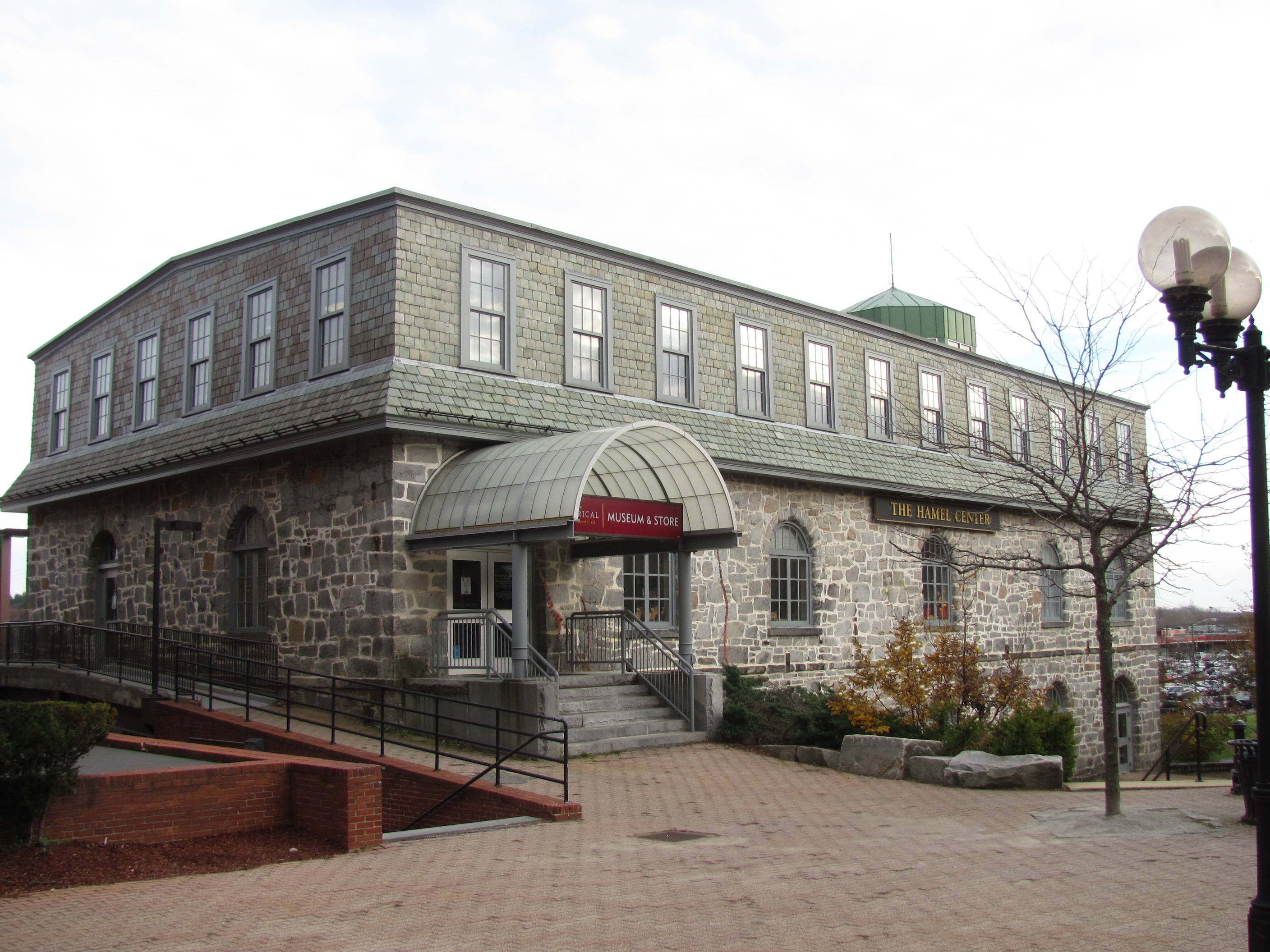
The Hamel Center of the New Hampshire Historical Society

Founded in 1823, the Society marked its 200th anniversary in 2023. The organization chronicled its history in two issues of its journal, Historical New Hampshire.

Over two centuries the Society has amassed a collection that includes thousands of books, documents, and objects documenting the history of New Hampshire. Information about the collections, including thousands of images, is available through the Society’s online collections catalog at nhhistory.org.

The Society shares its collections through its library, museum, websites, publications, exhibitions, and school and adult educational programs.

In 2017 the Society launched the “Democracy Project: Revitalizing History and Civics Education in New Hampshire Schools.” The project resulted in the creation of an educational resource for students and educators called "Moose on the Loose: Social Studies for Granite State Kids.” In 2024 the Society received a Leadership in History Award from the American Association for State and Local History for Moose on Loose: Social Studies for Granite State Kids.

The Society is governed by a board of trustees and employs a professional staff. Its library and museum, located at 30 Park Street in Concord, is open to the public year-round.

The New Hampshire Historical Society is a 501c3 nonprofit organization supported by membership dues and contributions.

In 2026, the society organized a statewide scavenger hunt.

== See also ==
- List of historical societies in New Hampshire

== Sources ==
- The Act of Incorporation, Constitution, and By-Laws of the New Hampshire Historical Society, 1823, Jacob Bailey Moore, Concord, NH.
- Croom, Emily Anne. The Genealogist's Companion and Sourcebook, 2003, Betterway Books, Cincinnati, OH.
- Karr, Paul. Frommer's Vermont, New Hampshire and Maine, 2010, Wiley Publishing, Hoboken, NJ.
- Landry, Linda. Classic New Hampshire, Preserving the Granite State in Changing Times, 2003, University Press of New England, Lebanon, NH.
