= Curious George Cottage =

Coordinates: 43°56′44″N 71°30′2″W

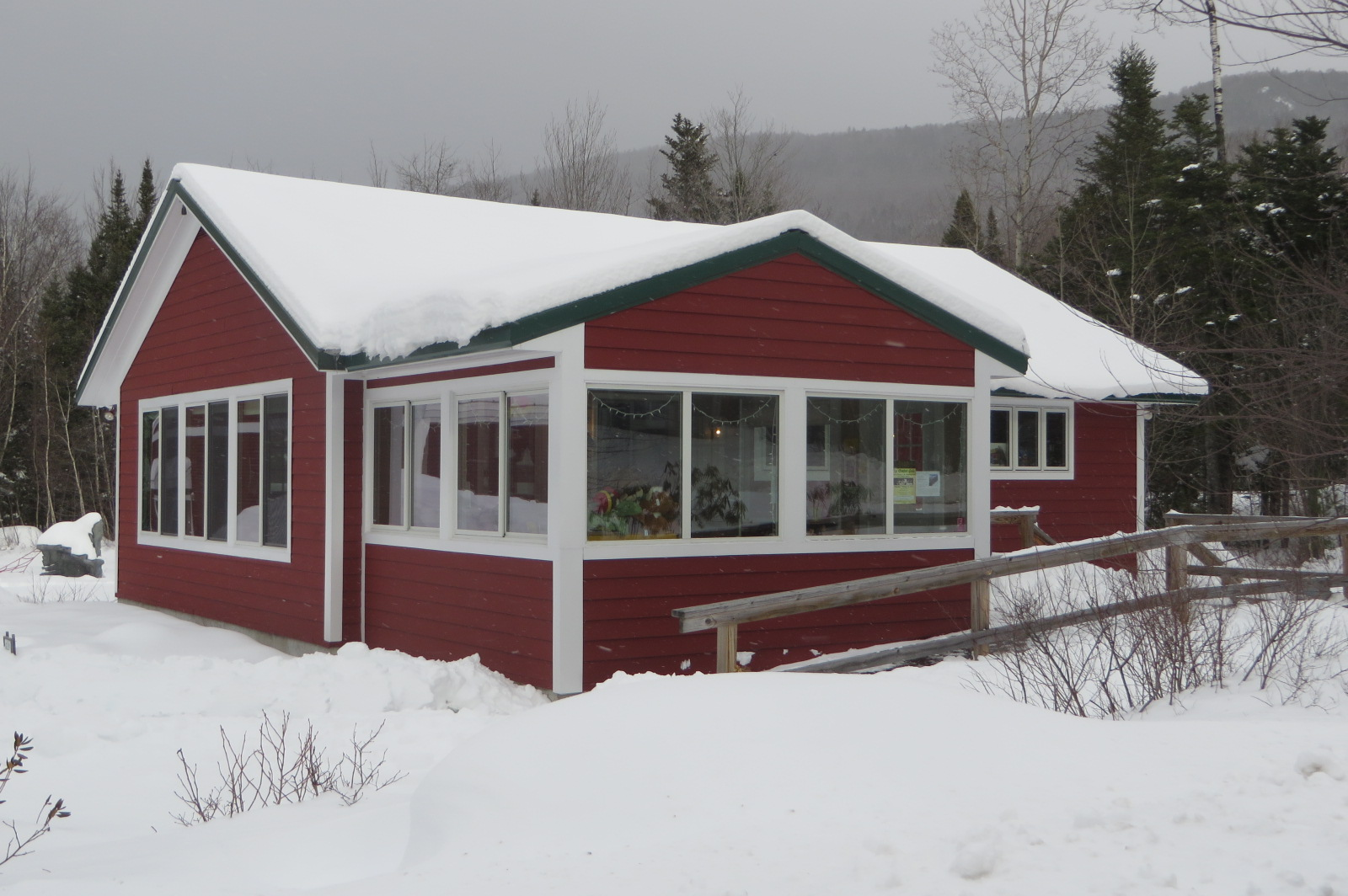
The Curious George Cottage

The Rey Cultural Center, better known as the Curious George Cottage was the summer home of H.A. Rey and Margret Rey, creators of the Curious George series of children’s books, located in Waterville Valley, New Hampshire.

The Reys first came to Waterville Valley in the 1950s. Hans was revising his popular astronomy book The Stars: A New Way to See Them and needed a place away from the glare of city lights to do observation. Waterville Valley, an "inland island" surrounded by hundreds of acres of national forest, was the perfect location for stargazing and the many outdoor activities the Reys loved. They spent the next twenty summers there, and wrote several Curious George stories while in Waterville Valley.

The Reys’ cottage soon became an intellectual center for the town, hosting book clubs, discussion groups, and the opportunity to watch a children's author at work. Hans was known for his chalk talks, in which he would entertain visitors as he drew. Well-behaved children got to take a drawing home with them. At other times, he would take local children on nature walks, which often included conversations with imaginary people, thanks to his ability to throw his voice.

After the Reys died, the cottage was donated to the town of Waterville Valley. It is now managed as The Rey Cultural Center, providing educational and recreational programs for children and families.
