= Raymond station =

- Raymond Boston and Maine Railroad Depot
- U.S. National Register of Historic Places
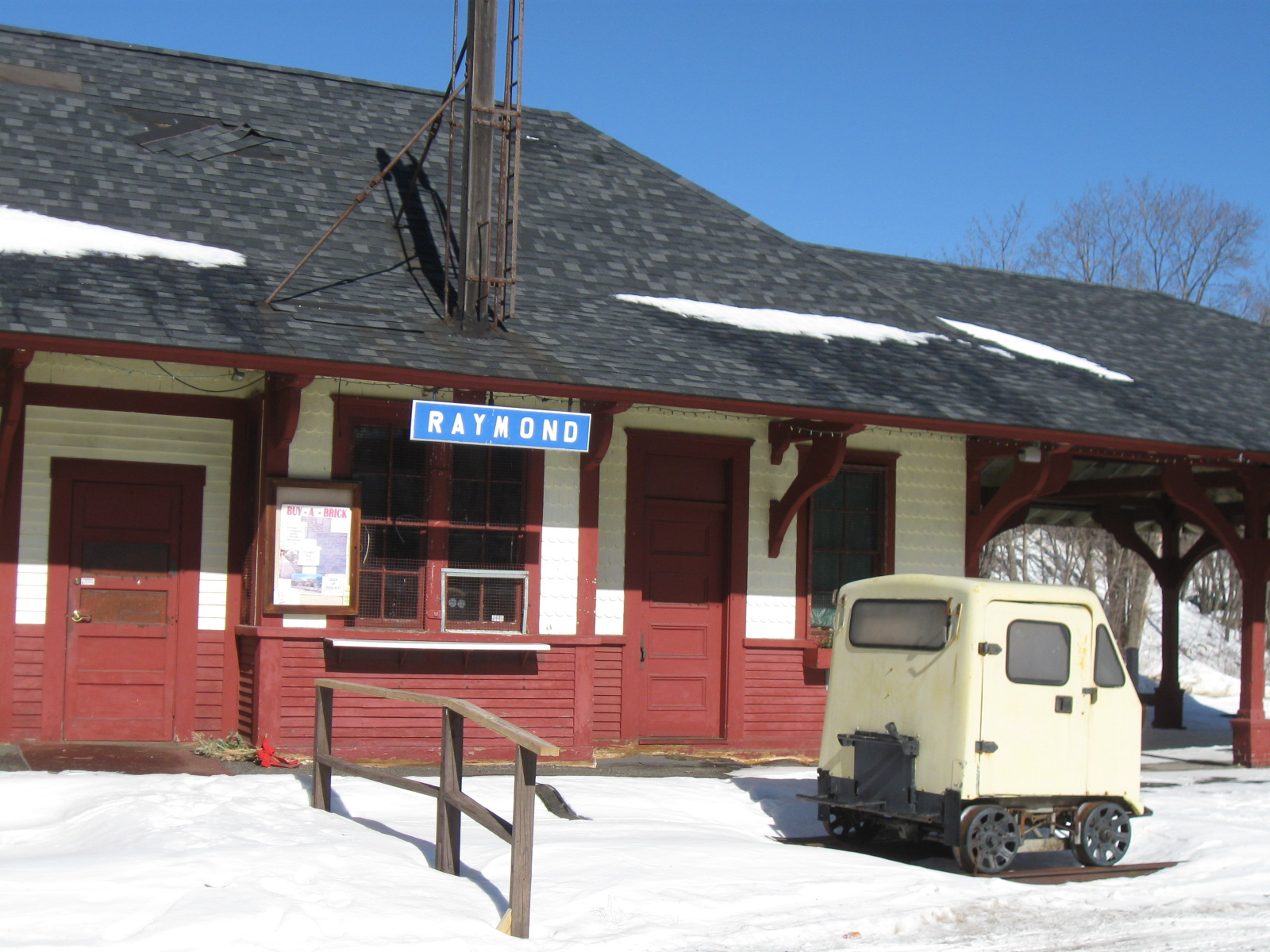

- Location within New Hampshire Location within the United States
- Location: 1 Depot St. Raymond, New Hampshire
- Coordinates: 43°2′9″N 71°10′53″W
- Area: 1 acre (0.40 ha)
- Built: 1893
- NRHP reference No.: 79000209
- Added to NRHP: May 16, 1979

The Raymond Railroad Depot is a historic former Boston and Maine railroad station at 1 Depot Street in the center of Raymond, New Hampshire. Built in 1893, it is one of the state's finest and least-altered 19th-century stations. It is presently operated by the Raymond Historical Society as a museum, and was added to the National Register of Historic Places in 1979.

== Description and history ==
The Raymond Railroad Depot is located in the town's village center, on the east side of Main Street between Depot Street and the former right-of-way of the Boston and Maine Railroad Portsmouth Branch, now the Rockingham Recreational Trail. It is an oblong basically rectangular single-story wood-frame structure, with a hip roof extending beyond the building dimensions to provide shelter on the adjacent platform areas. The roof is supported by chamfered square posts with sawn brackets, and also has exposed rafter ends as a decorative feature. The building is finished in a combination of wooden clapboards and scallop-cut shingles. There are several projecting sections, including the ticket booth on the track side of the building, where original semaphore signaling equipment is located. The interior of the building, adapted for use as a museum, retains significant features, including original benches in the waiting area, and gates separated the baggage area from the ticketing area.

Raymond was first served by a railroad in 1850, when the Portsmouth and Concord Railroad opened service. Its first station burned in 1878 and was soon rebuilt, but also burned in an 1892 fire that leveled much of the village center. The present building was built in 1893 by the Boston and Maine, which had acquired the Portsmouth and Concord. The Raymond Historical Society restored the depot building and keeps a locomotive, a boxcar, a caboose, and a work car on display nearby.

== See also ==
- National Register of Historic Places listings in Rockingham County, New Hampshire
