= Monadnock Region =

Region of New Hampshire, United States

Coordinates: 42°56′40″N 72°14′30″W

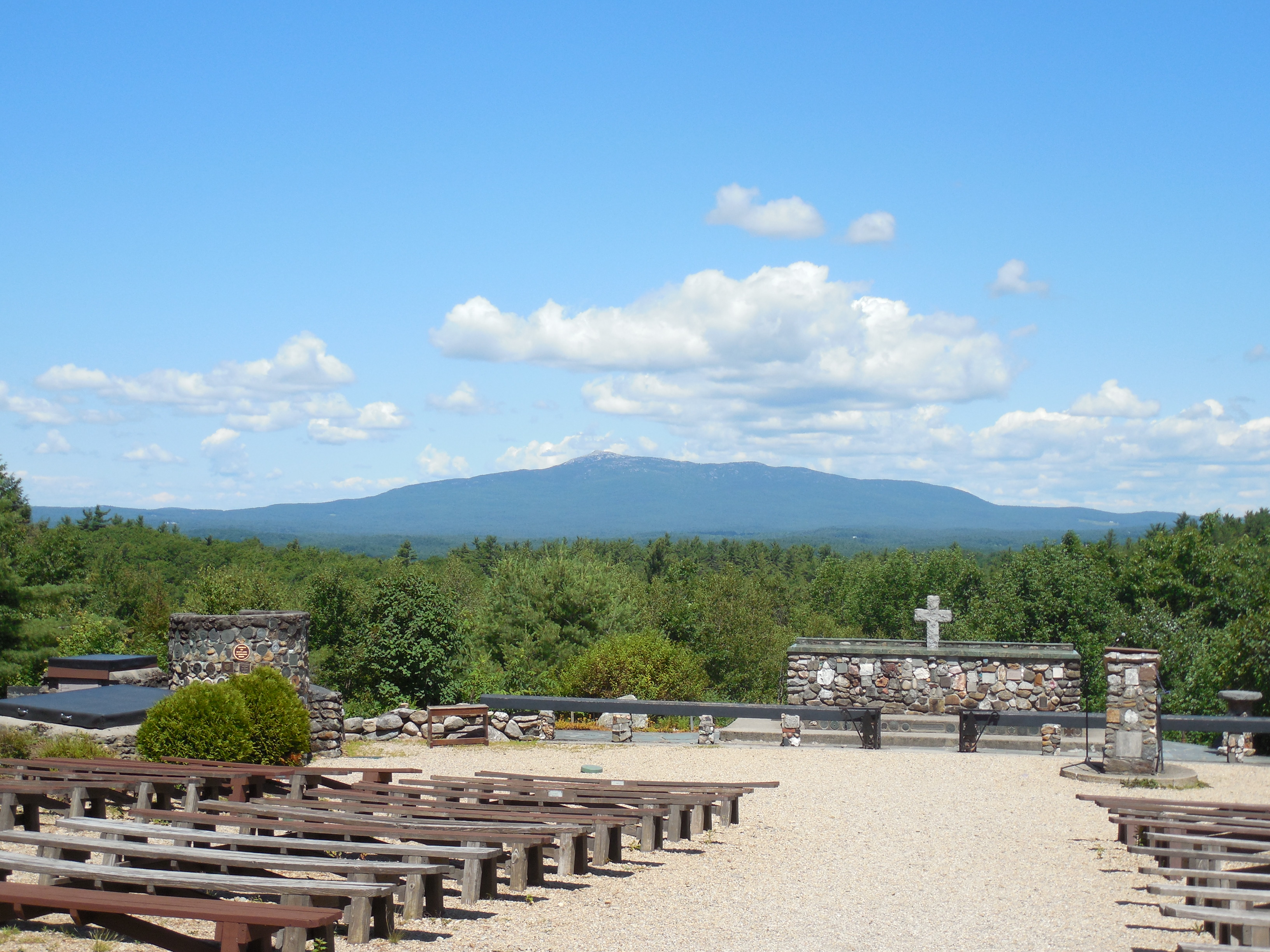
View of Mount Monadnock from Cathedral of the Pines in Rindge

The Monadnock Region is a region in southwestern New Hampshire. It is named after Mount Monadnock, a 3,165 foot isolated mountain, which is the dominant geographic landmark in the region. Although it has no specific borders, the Monadnock Region is generally thought of comprising all of Cheshire County and the western portion of Hillsborough County.

In addition to the frequently hiked Mount Monadnock, the region offers abundant opportunities for outdoor recreation, including four New Hampshire state parks. Pisgah State Park consists of 13,300 acres (5,400 ha) of forest, seven protected ponds popular for fishing, and six trails that may be used for hiking, mountain biking, ATVs, and snowmobiles. The Monadnock Region also has four recreational rail trails, lakes with public swimming beaches, and three ski areas.

The largest municipality, and only city, in the region is Keene with 23,409 residents. The nearby town of Peterborough is famous for the MacDowell Colony and for being the setting of the Thornton Wilder play Our Town. Other notable landmarks in the region include Cathedral of the Pines and Franklin Pierce College, both located in Rindge.

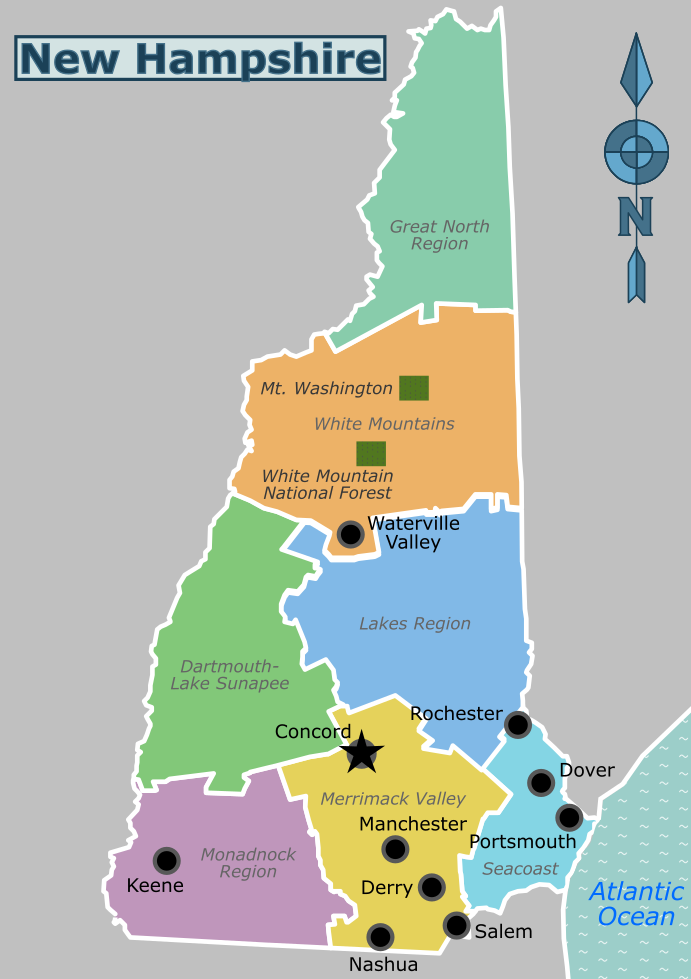
In this map from the N.H. Department of Transportation from 2018, the Monadnock Region (in purple) is located at the southwestern corner of the state and anchored by the city of Keene.
