= Great Bay National Estuarine Research Reserve =

Diversity of land and water areas around Great Bay

Coordinates: 43.05509°N 70.89863°W

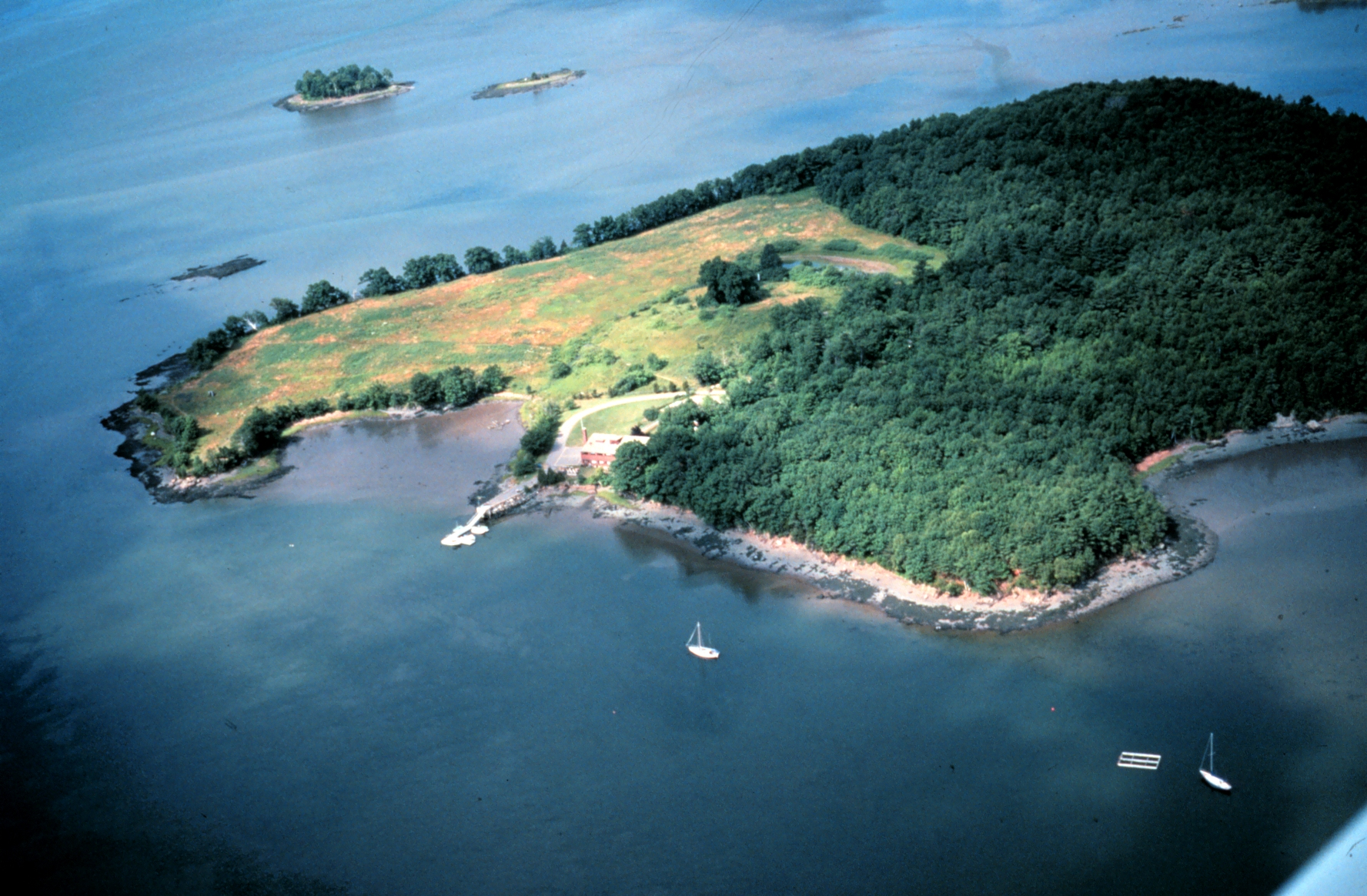

The Great Bay National Estuarine Research Reserve encompasses a diversity of land and water areas around Great Bay, an estuary in southeastern New Hampshire. Protected lands cover 10,235 acres (4,142 ha), including approximately 7,300 acres (3,000 ha) of open water and wetlands that include salt marshes, rocky shores, bluffs, woodlands, open fields, and riverine systems and tidal waters.

Great Bay has a rich cultural history and was the first major commercial waterway developed by the early settlers.

The National Estuarine Research Reserve System (NERRS) is a nationwide network of state-owned and -managed coastal protected areas. These are designated and supported by the National Oceanic and Atmospheric Administration (NOAA) under the United States Department of Commerce.

The New Hampshire Fish and Game Department under the Marine Fisheries Division manages the Great Bay NERR. Designated in 1989, the reserve's primary purpose is to promote the wise use and management of the Great Bay estuary.

== Visiting ==
The Great Bay Discovery Center, located in Greenland, New Hampshire, features interpretive exhibits about the estuary's natural history, salt marsh farming, salmon migration, plankton, tides and research.

Other facilities on the grounds include the Hugh Gregg Coastal Conservation Center, used for education programs and available for rental, a universally accessible trail and boardwalk, a 19th-century gundalow replica, a replica Native American camp and gardens.
