= Delta Bus Lines =

American bus operator

- Founded: 1985
- Headquarters: Greenville, Mississippi
- Locale: Mississippi, United States
- Service type: Inter-city bus
- Alliance: National Bus Traffic Association
- Routes: 5
- Stops: 6
- Website: https://deltabuslines.net/

Delta Bus Lines is an intercity and charter bus operator serving the Mississippi Delta region of the southern United States.

Based in Greenville, Mississippi, Delta provides scheduled and charter operations in three states—Mississippi, Tennessee, and Louisiana—and maintains service locations in six cities in Mississippi: Clarksdale, Cleveland, Greenville, Indianola, Natchez, and Port Gibson.

== Routes ==
Delta Bus Lines operates five scheduled routes:

- Memphis to Clarksdale
- Memphis to Indianola
- Indianola to Jackson
- Greenville to Baton Rouge
- Baton Rouge to Memphis

== See also ==
- Intercity bus service in the United States
