= C&J Bus Lines =

American bus operator

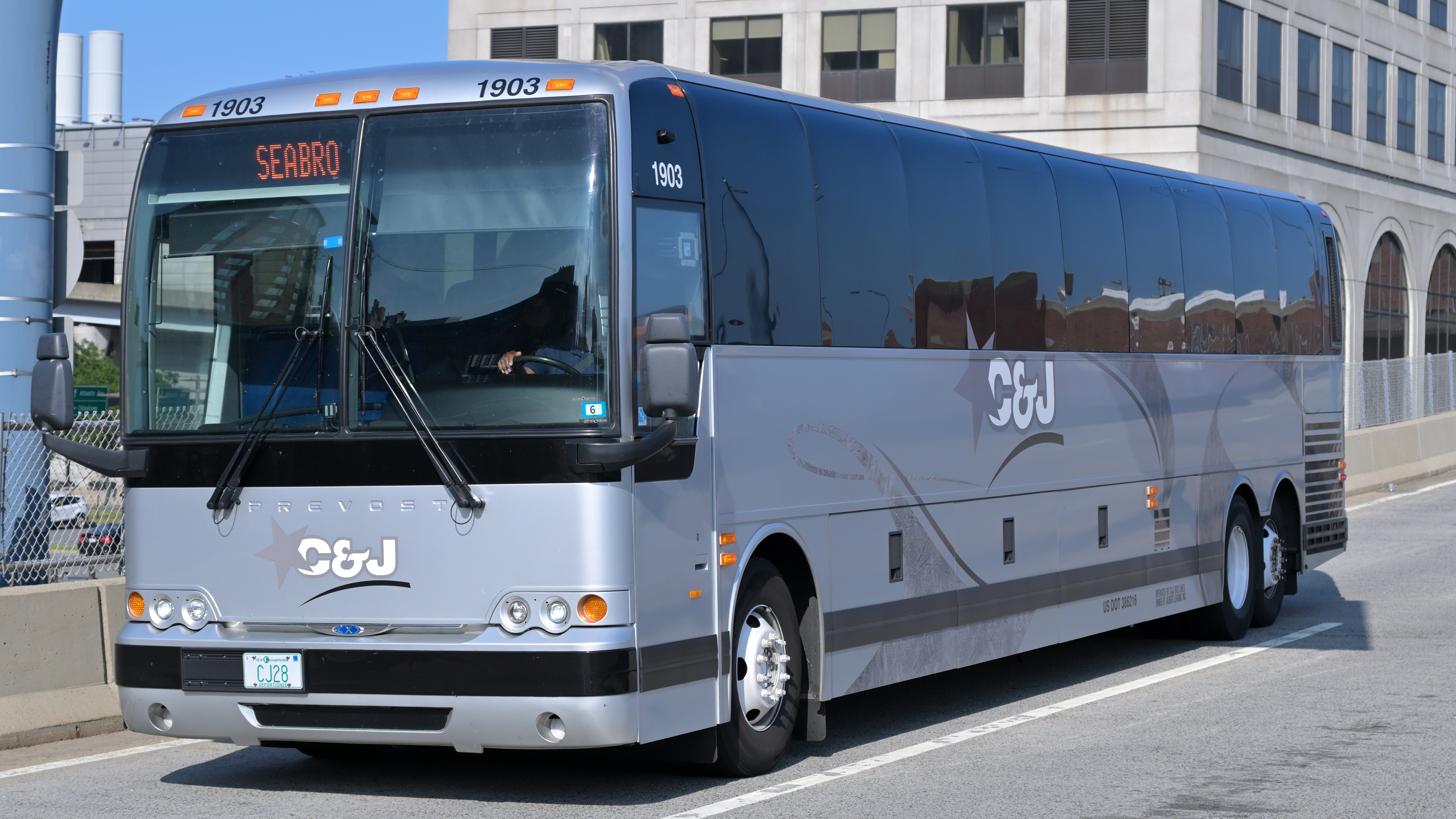
- C&J bus in Boston in July 2025
- Founded: 1968
- Headquarters: Portsmouth, New Hampshire
- Locale: New England, United States
- Service type: Inter-city bus
- Website: https://www.ridecj.com/

C&J Bus Lines is an intercity and charter bus operator primarily serving the New England region of the United States, with routes serving the states of New Hampshire, Massachusetts, and New York.

Headquartered in Portsmouth, New Hampshire, C&J operates a limited set of scheduled services between several cities in New Hampshire—Dover, Portsmouth, and Seabrook—and two major transportation hubs: Logan International Airport in Boston and the Port Authority Bus Terminal in New York City.

== See also ==
- Intercity bus service in the United States
