= Mexicoach =

- Founded: 1970
- Headquarters: 4570 Camino de la Plaza
- Locale: San Diego, California
- Service type: express bus service
- Routes: 2
- Stops: 4

Mexicoach is a private transportation operator that provides cross-border service in the San Diego–Tijuana metropolitan area. The company has been in existence since 1970, with the main purpose of allowing day trippers to avoid the one-mile walk between customs and the Avenida Revolución. In recent years, the service's draw has been to avoid the long lines at the port of entry, which have plagued both vehicular and foot travellers, because Mexicoach passes between the two nations in a special clearance lane.

The coachline runs two routes. The primary line runs from the San Ysidro district of San Diego, picking up San Diego public transit users at the San Ysidro Transit Center or travellers leaving their cars at the Border Station Lot, to the Mexicoach Terminal on Avenida Revolución. The secondary line is designed for both Mexican and American beachgoers, as it runs from the terminal in Tijuana to a station connected to the Rosarito Beach Hotel in the ocean resort town of Playas de Rosarito.

== See also ==
- Intercity buses in the United States
