= Tufesa =

Mexican bus line

Tufesa (stylized as TUFESA) is an intercity bus line owned by Autotransportes Tufesa S.A. de C.V. that operates in Northwestern Mexico and Southwestern United States. The company operates a fleet of several hundred buses, consisting of Volvo, Scania, and Irizar coaches. Tufesa Internacional, the American division of the company, offers routes that cover several major cities in California, Arizona, Utah, and Nevada in the U.S., while the parent company covers areas in Baja California, Sonora, Sinaloa, Nayarit, Jalisco, and Michoacán. Although Tufesa does not directly operate in the US (instead using a subsidiary), many of its routes cross international borders between Mexico and the United States. Tufesa also operates a parcel-shipping service called TufesaPACK. Packages shipped by TufesaPACK are put into the luggage compartments of buses headed to the package's destination.

== History ==
Tufesa was founded in 1993 in the Mexican state of Sonora. At the time, the company consisted of a single bus exclusively for local workers. The company then expanded to public intercity passenger transport.

In December 2022, Tufesa suffered a deadly accident near Baker CA after a driver veered off Interstate 15. The reason for the crash is unknown.

== See also ==
- Intercity buses in the United States
