= Pacific Crest Bus Lines =

American bus operator

- Headquarters: Redmond, Oregon
- Locale: Pacific Northwest, United States
- Service type: Inter-city bus
- Routes: 6
- Website: https://pacificcrestbuslines.net/

Pacific Crest Bus Lines is an intercity and charter bus operator serving Oregon in the Pacific Northwest region of the United States.

Headquartered in Redmond, Oregon, Pacific Crest operates a six scheduled services:

- Bend to Eugene
- Medford to Eugene
- Bend to Salem and Portland
- Eugene to Florence (Lane Transit District service)
- Brookings to Klamath Falls (Oregon POINT service)
- Portland to Corvallis and Eugene (99 Vine)

== See also ==
- Intercity bus service in the United States
