= Portsmouth, New Hampshire =

City in New Hampshire, United States

- City
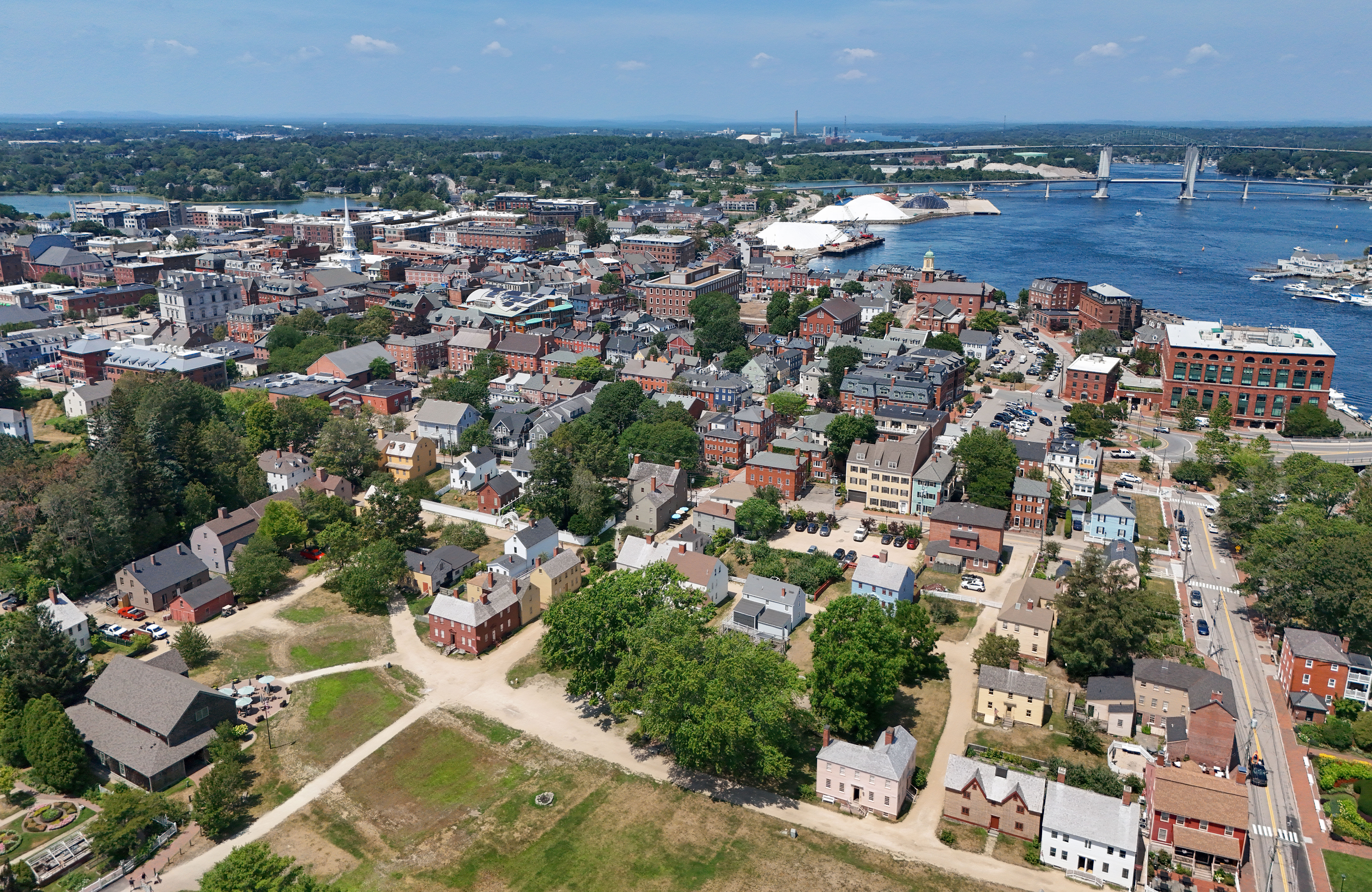
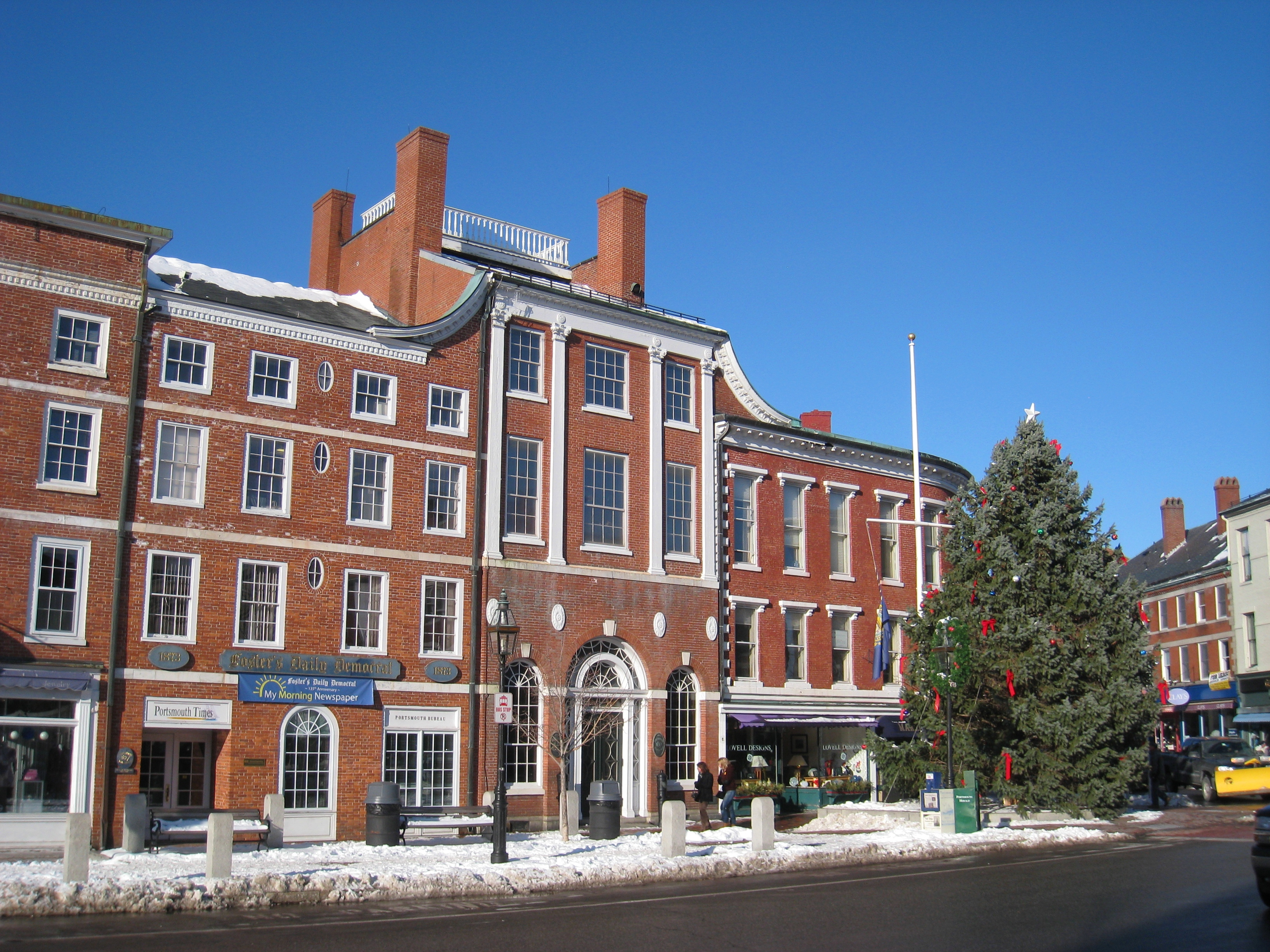
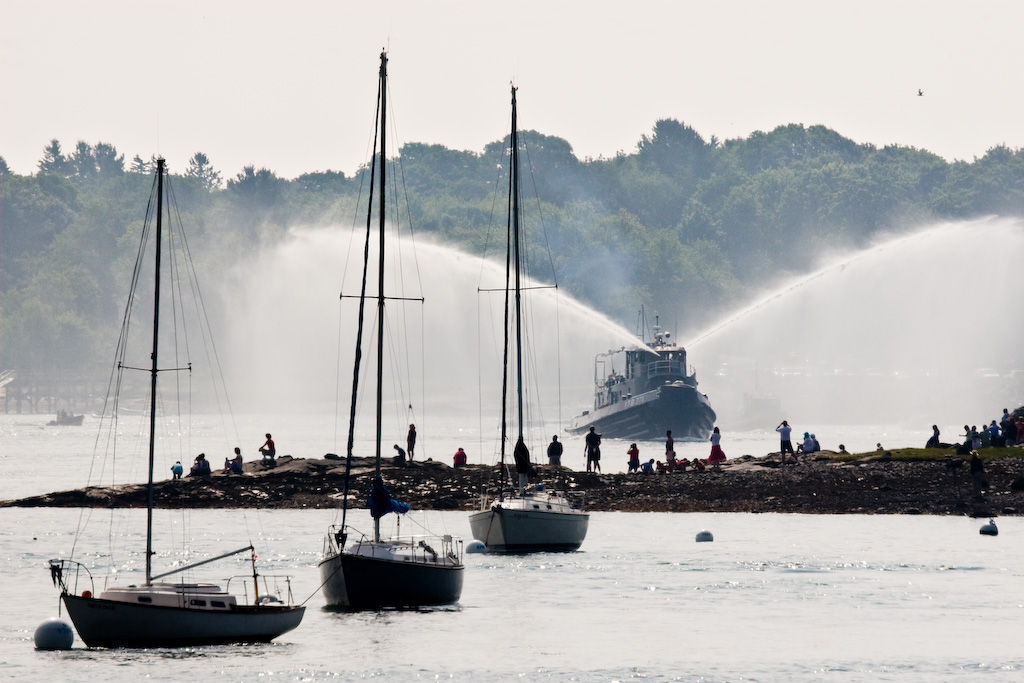
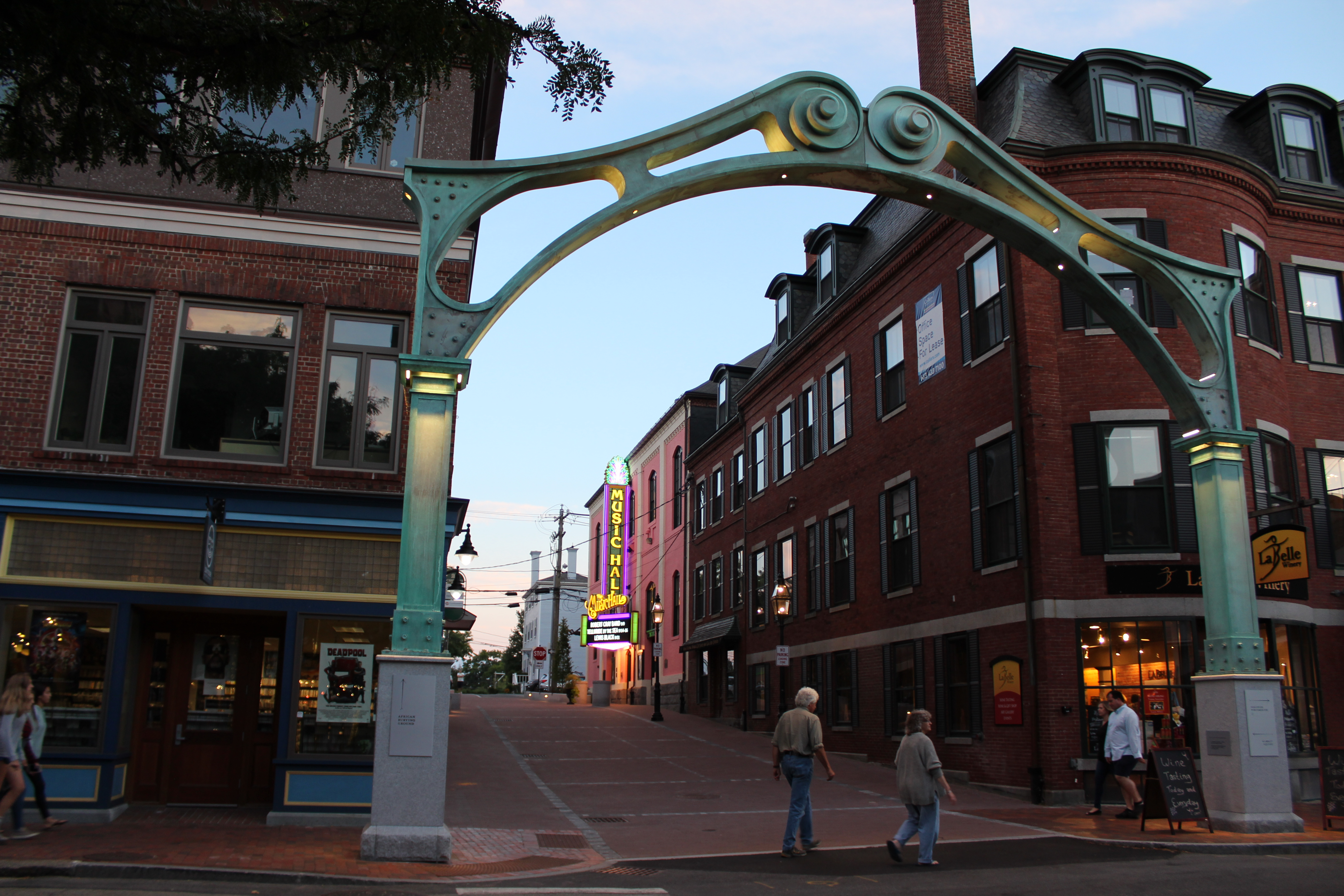
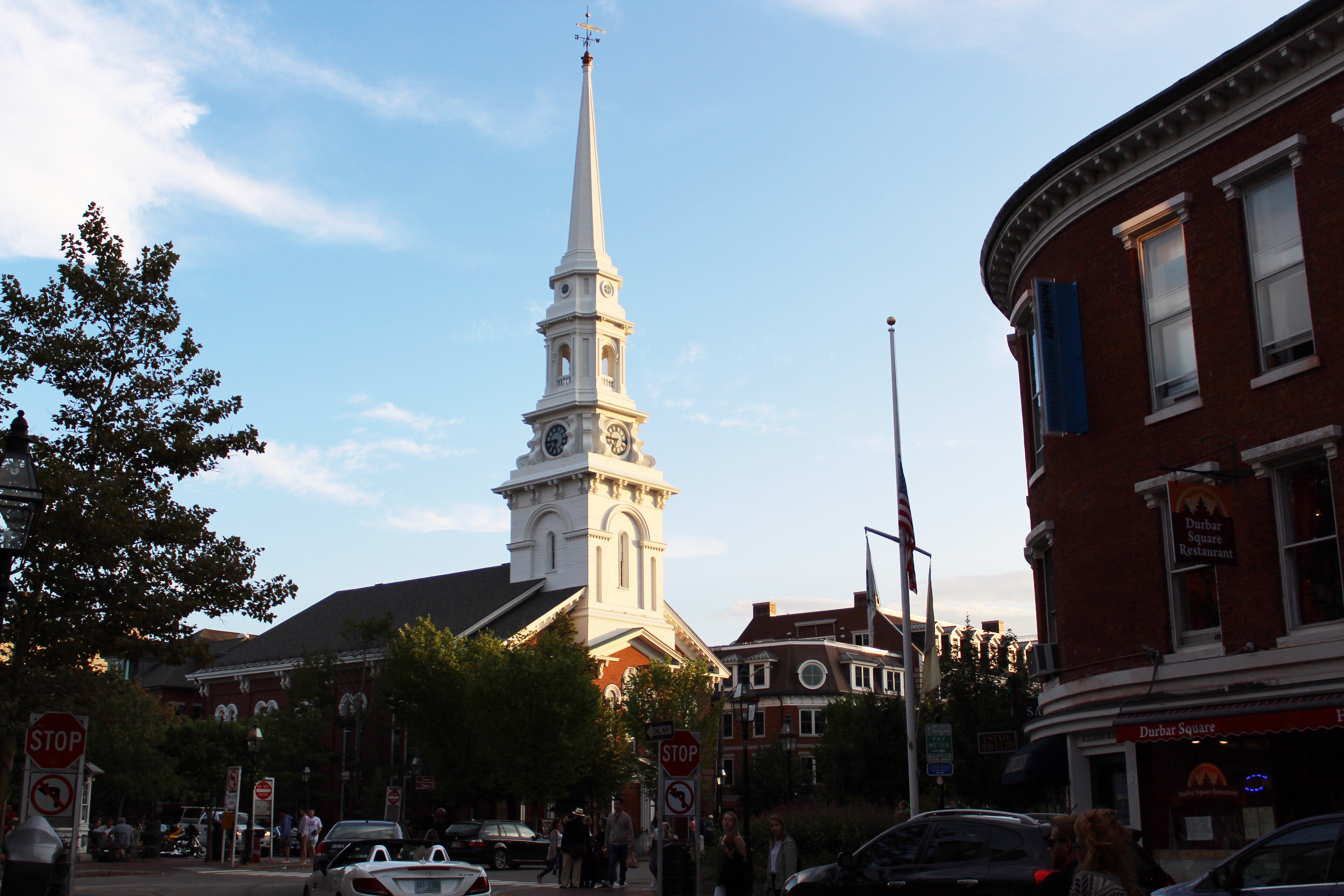
- Aerial view of Portsmouth Market Square Naval fireboat Chestnut Street Arch North Church

- Flag Seal
- Interactive map of Portsmouth, New Hampshire
- Location within New Hampshire Location within the United States
- Coordinates: 43°03′29″N 70°46′57″W
- Country: United States
- State: New Hampshire
- County: Rockingham
- Settled: 1630
- Incorporated: 1653
- Incorporated (city): 1849
- Named for: Portsmouth, Hampshire

Area
  - Total: 16.82 sq mi (43.57 km^{2})
  - Land: 15.66 sq mi (40.56 km^{2})
  - Water: 1.16 sq mi (3.01 km^{2}) 6.92%
- Elevation: 66 ft (20 m)

Population (2020)
  - Total: 21,956
  - Density: 1,402.0/sq mi (541.31/km^{2})
- Time zone: UTC−5 (Eastern)
  - Summer (DST): UTC−4 (Eastern)
- ZIP codes: 03801–03804
- Area code: 603
- FIPS code: 33-62900
- GNIS feature ID: 873703
- Website: portsmouthnh.gov

Portsmouth is a city in Rockingham County, New Hampshire, United States. It had a population of 21,956 at the 2020 census. A historic seaport and popular summer tourist destination on the Piscataqua River bordering the state of Maine, Portsmouth was formerly home to Pease Air Force Base, since converted to Portsmouth International Airport at Pease.

== History ==
=== European settlement ===
The first European to explore and write about the area was Martin Pring in 1603. The Piscataqua River is a tidal estuary with a swift current, but forms a good natural harbor. The west bank of the harbor was settled by European colonists in 1630 and named Strawbery Banke, after the many wild strawberries growing there. The village was protected by Fort William and Mary on what is now New Castle Island. Strategically located for trade between upstream industries and mercantile interests abroad, the port prospered. Fishing, lumber and shipbuilding were the principal businesses of the region.

=== Colonial development and slavery ===
Enslaved Africans were imported as laborers as early as 1645 and were integral to building the city's prosperity. Portsmouth participated in the Triangle Trade, which generated profits from slavery.

At the town's incorporation in 1653, it was named "Portsmouth" in honor of the colony's founder, John Mason. He had been captain of the English port of Portsmouth, Hampshire, after which New Hampshire is named. Richard Martyn was one of the founders of the first church in Portsmouth, and served as Selectman, Representative to the General Court, Speaker of the House, and Chief Justice.

Portsmouth was spared many of the French and Indian raids that occurred during King William's War. However, many neighboring towns were attacked, including Dover, Durham, and York. While the war was ongoing, the shipyard in Portsmouth completed its first ship for the Royal Navy, HMS Falkland in 1696.

When Queen Anne's War ended in 1712, Governor Joseph Dudley selected the town to host negotiations for the 1713 Treaty of Portsmouth, which temporarily ended hostilities between the Abenaki Indians and the colonies of Massachusetts Bay and New Hampshire.

=== American Revolution ===
In 1774, in the lead-up to the Revolution, Paul Revere rode to Portsmouth to warn that the British Royal Navy was coming to capture the port. Although Fort William and Mary protected the harbor, the Patriot government moved the capital inland to Exeter to avoid threats from the Royal Navy, which bombarded Falmouth (now Portland, Maine) on October 18, 1775. Portsmouth served as a destination for several of Beaumarchais's ships carryingmateriel, such as artillery, tents, and gunpowder, to support the American revolutionary effort.

African Americans participated in defending Portsmouth and New England during the war. In 1779, 19 enslaved African Americans from Portsmouth wrote a petition to the state legislature requesting the abolition of slavery, citing their war contributions and the principles of the Revolution. The legislature tabled their petition. New Hampshire abolished slavery in 1857, by which time the institution was effectively extinct in the state.

When New Hampshire voted to ratify the new U.S. Constitution in 1788, it became the ninth and decisive state needed to establish the federal government. Portsmouth celebrated this historic moment with a grand parade featuring representatives from 78 different trades, reflecting the city's economic diversity and national significance.

=== 19th century development ===
Thomas Jefferson's 1807 embargo against American trade with Britain severely disrupted New England's trade with Canada, causing several local businessmen to go bankrupt. Portsmouth hosted numerous privateers during the War of 1812. In 1849, Portsmouth was incorporated as a city.

Once one of the nation's busiest ports and shipbuilding cities, Portsmouth expressed its wealth through fine architecture. The city features significant examples of Colonial, Georgian, and Federal style houses, some of which now serve as museums. Portsmouth's downtown core consists of stately brick Federalist stores and townhouses, built uniformly after devastating early 19th-century fires. The most destructive fire occurred in 1813 when 244 buildings burned. A fire district was subsequently created that required all new buildings within its boundaries to be built of brick with slate roofs, creating the downtown's distinctive appearance. The city was also noted for producing boldly wood-veneered federal-style (neoclassical) furniture, particularly by master cabinetmaker Langley Boardman.

The Industrial Revolution spurred economic growth in New Hampshire mill towns such as Dover, Keene, Laconia, Manchester, Nashua and Rochester, where rivers provided water power for mills. This shift in economic activity to the new mill towns led to the decline of Portsmouth's port, though the city survived the Victorian-era economic downturn, a period described in the works of Thomas Bailey Aldrich, particularly in his 1869 novel The Story of a Bad Boy.

=== 20th century preservation and urban renewal ===
In the 20th century, the city established a Historic District Commission to protect much of the city's architectural legacy. In 2008, the National Trust for Historic Preservation named Portsmouth one of the "Dozen Distinctive Destinations". The compact and walkable downtown on the waterfront attracts tourists and artists who frequent the cafes, restaurants and shops around Market Square. Portsmouth annually celebrates the revitalization of its downtown (particularly Market Square) with Market Square Day, a celebration dating back to 1977, produced by the non-profit Pro Portsmouth, Inc.

=== Military developments ===
During World War II, Portsmouth Municipal Airport was expanded and converted to military use, eventually becoming Pease Air Force Base in 1956. Named after New Hampshire Medal of Honor recipient Captain Harl Pease Jr., the Strategic Air Command facility housed nuclear bombers including the renowned 509th Bomb Wing during the Cold War era. The base served as a crucial component of America's nuclear deterrent until its closure in 1991 under the Base Realignment and Closure process.

The Portsmouth Naval Shipyard's contribution to submarine technology advanced significantly with the construction of the experimental USS Albacore in 1953. This revolutionary research submarine pioneered the teardrop hull design that became standard for all modern submarines and set world underwater speed records during its service until 1972. The vessel was designated a National Historic Landmark and returned to Portsmouth as a museum in 1985.

=== Urban renewal and preservation ===
The city's emphasis on historic preservation and revitalization emerged from a period of significant destruction. Portsmouth's current walkable character results from its network of streets and dense blocks filled with preserved Revolution-era homes. However, like many cities throughout the region and nation, Portsmouth experienced urban renewal, a federally funded planning initiative designed to address "urban blight" and revitalize downtown cores after decades of suburbanization and declining tax revenue. Portsmouth's urban renewal district encompassed the North End neighborhood, which, similar to Boston's North End, was home to a significant Italian-American population.

In 1964, federal funds were allocated to the North End project area for urban renewal. Prior to redevelopment, the North End contained a mix of residential and commercial buildings, with many older houses converted into storefronts with apartments above. By the mid-1960s, the area was considered overcrowded, deteriorated, and a fire hazard. The Portsmouth Housing Authority proposed demolishing approximately 200 buildings, a school, and a church, with redevelopment planned for commercial, industrial, and public use rather than residential purposes. The project would have displaced approximately 300 families. In 1968, Portsmouth Preservation Inc., a preservation organization, was formed to save some of the historic building stock slated for redevelopment. After extensive advocacy efforts, only fourteen houses were saved and mostly relocated to an area now known as "The Hill". This preservation effort marked the beginning of broader initiatives that eventually led to the creation of the aforementioned historic district.

=== Shipbuilding heritage ===
Portsmouth's shipbuilding history has maintained a long symbiotic relationship with Kittery, Maine, across the Piscataqua River. In 1781–1782, naval hero John Paul Jones lived in Portsmouth while supervising construction of his ship Ranger, which was built on nearby Badger's Island in Kittery. During that time, he boarded at the Captain Gregory Purcell house, which now bears Jones' name as the only surviving property in the United States associated with him. Built by master housewright Hopestill Cheswell, an African American, it has been designated as a National Historic Landmark and now serves as the Portsmouth Historical Society Museum.

The Portsmouth Naval Shipyard, established in 1800 as the first federal navy yard, is located on Seavey's Island in Kittery, Maine. The facility gained international prominence as the site of the 1905 signing of the Treaty of Portsmouth which ended the Russo-Japanese War. Although U.S. President Theodore Roosevelt orchestrated the peace conference that brought Russian and Japanese diplomats to Portsmouth and the Shipyard, he did not personally visit Portsmouth, relying instead on the Navy and people of New Hampshire to serve as hosts. Roosevelt received the 1906 Nobel Peace Prize for his diplomatic efforts in ending the war.

== Geography ==
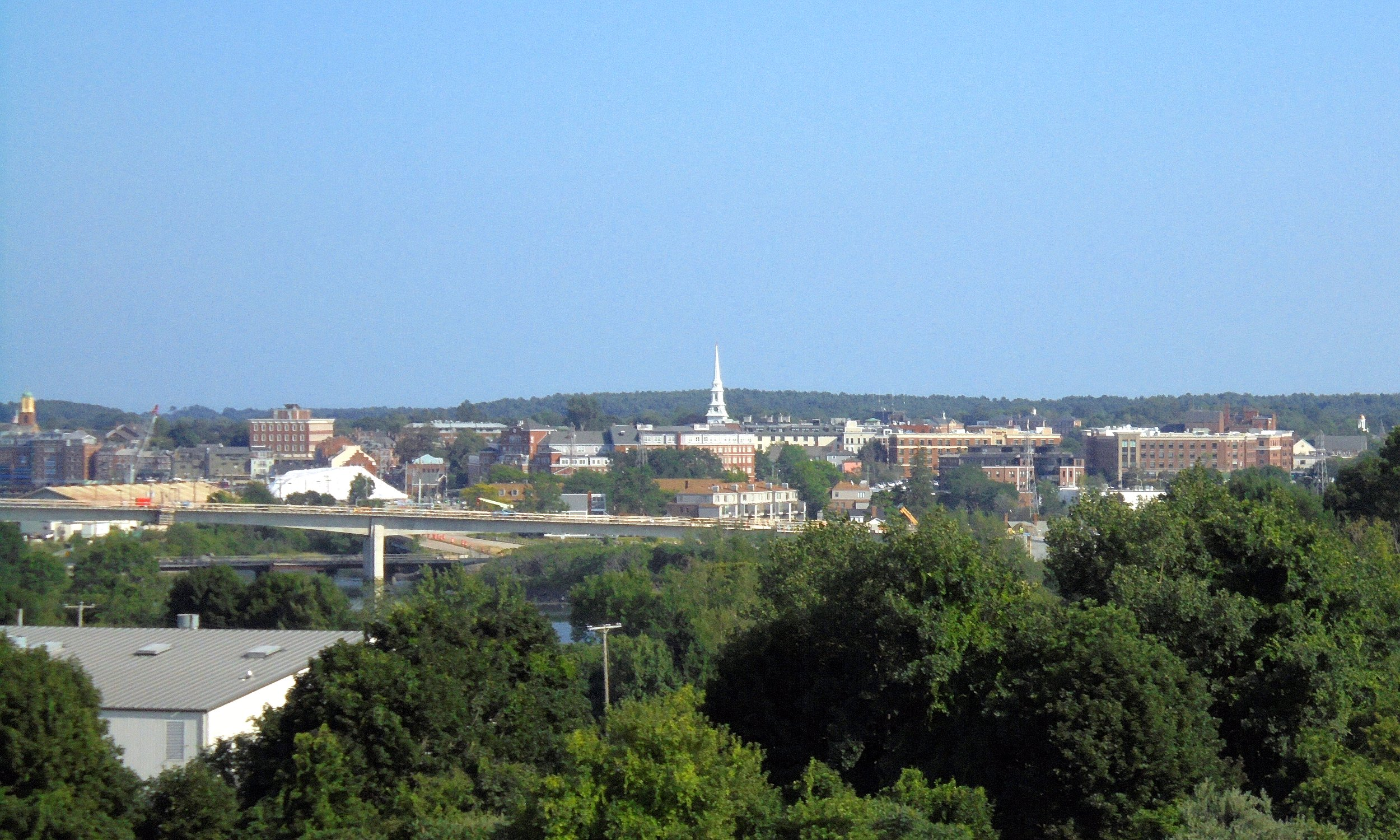
Portsmouth downtown from I-95

According to the United States Census Bureau, the city has a total area of 16.8 square miles (43.6 km^{2}), of which 15.7 square miles (40.6 km^{2}) are land and 1.2 square miles (3.0 km^{2}), or 6.92%, are water. Portsmouth is drained by Berrys Brook, Sagamore Creek and the Piscataqua River, which is the boundary between New Hampshire and Maine. The highest point in the city is 110 feet (34 m) above sea level, within Pease International Airport.

=== Climate ===
According to the Köppen climate classification system, Portsmouth has a warm-summer humid continental climate, abbreviated "Dfb" on climate maps. The highest temperature recorded in Portsmouth was 104 °F (40.0 °C) on August 2, 1975, while the lowest temperature recorded was −26 °F (−32.2 °C) on January 22, 1984.

Climate data for Portsmouth, New Hampshire, 1991–2020 normals, extremes 1954–present
Month	Jan	Feb	Mar	Apr	May	Jun	Jul	Aug	Sep	Oct	Nov	Dec	Year
Record high °F (°C)	71 (22)	75 (24)	89 (32)	94 (34)	94 (34)	97 (36)	102 (39)	104 (40)	96 (36)	88 (31)	78 (26)	75 (24)	104 (40)
Mean maximum °F (°C)	55.3 (12.9)	56.8 (13.8)	66.0 (18.9)	81.2 (27.3)	88.1 (31.2)	91.3 (32.9)	93.6 (34.2)	92.0 (33.3)	88.3 (31.3)	78.4 (25.8)	68.9 (20.5)	57.8 (14.3)	95.3 (35.2)
Mean daily maximum °F (°C)	32.6 (0.3)	35.6 (2.0)	43.3 (6.3)	55.8 (13.2)	66.1 (18.9)	75.0 (23.9)	80.5 (26.9)	79.4 (26.3)	71.8 (22.1)	59.7 (15.4)	48.1 (8.9)	37.8 (3.2)	57.1 (14.0)
Daily mean °F (°C)	24.4 (−4.2)	26.6 (−3.0)	34.3 (1.3)	45.3 (7.4)	55.4 (13.0)	64.5 (18.1)	70.3 (21.3)	69.1 (20.6)	61.7 (16.5)	50.1 (10.1)	39.7 (4.3)	30.0 (−1.1)	47.6 (8.7)
Mean daily minimum °F (°C)	16.3 (−8.7)	17.6 (−8.0)	25.3 (−3.7)	34.8 (1.6)	44.8 (7.1)	54.1 (12.3)	60.1 (15.6)	58.8 (14.9)	51.7 (10.9)	40.5 (4.7)	31.2 (−0.4)	22.3 (−5.4)	38.1 (3.4)
Mean minimum °F (°C)	−4.2 (−20.1)	−1.2 (−18.4)	6.4 (−14.2)	22.7 (−5.2)	31.1 (−0.5)	41.2 (5.1)	49.4 (9.7)	47.5 (8.6)	35.4 (1.9)	26.4 (−3.1)	16.1 (−8.8)	4.8 (−15.1)	−6.9 (−21.6)
Record low °F (°C)	−26 (−32)	−15 (−26)	−8 (−22)	10 (−12)	15 (−9)	32 (0)	38 (3)	33 (1)	23 (−5)	14 (−10)	−6 (−21)	−17 (−27)	−26 (−32)
Average precipitation inches (mm)	3.63 (92)	3.57 (91)	4.77 (121)	4.56 (116)	3.95 (100)	4.59 (117)	3.89 (99)	3.66 (93)	4.08 (104)	4.95 (126)	4.12 (105)	4.88 (124)	50.65 (1,288)
Average snowfall inches (cm)	17.1 (43)	15.8 (40)	13.9 (35)	2.3 (5.8)	0.0 (0.0)	0.0 (0.0)	0.0 (0.0)	0.0 (0.0)	0.0 (0.0)	0.1 (0.25)	1.6 (4.1)	14.2 (36)	65.0 (165)
Average extreme snow depth inches (cm)	11.0 (28)	12.5 (32)	11.2 (28)	2.1 (5.3)	0.0 (0.0)	0.0 (0.0)	0.0 (0.0)	0.0 (0.0)	0.0 (0.0)	0.0 (0.0)	0.8 (2.0)	8.4 (21)	17.9 (45)
Average precipitation days (≥ 0.01 in)	10.6	9.3	10.9	11.1	11.3	11.3	10.7	8.7	9.1	10.6	10.9	11.3	125.8
Average snowy days (≥ 0.1 in)	6.9	5.9	4.6	0.9	0.0	0.0	0.0	0.0	0.0	0.0	1.0	5.3	24.6
Source: NOAA

== Demographics ==
Historical population
Census	Pop.	Note	%±
1790	4,720		—
1800	5,339		13.1%
1810	6,934		29.9%
1820	7,327		5.7%
1830	8,026		9.5%
1840	7,887		−1.7%
1850	9,738		23.5%
1860	9,335		−4.1%
1870	9,211		−1.3%
1880	9,690		5.2%
1890	9,827		1.4%
1900	10,637		8.2%
1910	11,269		5.9%
1920	13,569		20.4%
1930	14,495		6.8%
1940	14,821		2.2%
1950	18,830		27.0%
1960	26,900		42.9%
1970	25,717		−4.4%
1980	26,254		2.1%
1990	25,925		−1.3%
2000	20,784		−19.8%
2010	21,233		2.2%
2020	21,956		3.4%

Portsmouth is the sole city in Rockingham County, but the fourth-largest municipality, with fewer people than the towns of Derry, Londonderry, and Salem.

=== 2020 census ===
As of the 2020 census, Portsmouth had a population of 21,956. The median age was 42.8 years. 15.4% of residents were under the age of 18 and 19.9% of residents were 65 years of age or older. For every 100 females there were 97.3 males, and for every 100 females age 18 and over there were 96.1 males age 18 and over.

100.0% of residents lived in urban areas, while 0.0% lived in rural areas.

There were 10,478 households in Portsmouth, of which 19.7% had children under the age of 18 living in them. Of all households, 38.0% were married-couple households, 23.6% were households with a male householder and no spouse or partner present, and 29.3% were households with a female householder and no spouse or partner present. About 37.9% of all households were made up of individuals and 13.1% had someone living alone who was 65 years of age or older.

There were 11,161 housing units, of which 6.1% were vacant. The homeowner vacancy rate was 1.1% and the rental vacancy rate was 4.2%.

Racial composition as of the 2020 census
Race	Number	Percent
White	19,263	87.7%
Black or African American	249	1.1%
American Indian and Alaska Native	50	0.2%
Asian	1,010	4.6%
Native Hawaiian and Other Pacific Islander	8	0.0%
Some other race	212	1.0%
Two or more races	1,164	5.3%
Hispanic or Latino (of any race)	749	3.4%

=== 2010 census ===
As of the census of 2010, there were 21,233 people, 10,014 households, and 4,736 families residing in the city. The population density was 1,361.1 people per square mile (525.5 people/km^{2}). There were 10,625 housing units at an average density of 681.1 per square mile (263.0/km^{2}). The racial makeup of the city was 91.5% White, 1.7% African American, 0.2% Native American, 3.5% Asian, 0.01% Pacific Islander, 0.7% some other race, and 2.3% from two or more races. Hispanic or Latino of any race were 2.8% of the population.

There were 10,014 households, out of which 20.2% had children under the age of 18 living with them, 35.5% were headed by married couples living together, 8.3% had a female householder with no husband present, and 52.7% were non-families. 39.2% of all households were made up of individuals, and 11.8% were someone living alone who was 65 years of age or older. The average household size was 2.03, and the average family size was 2.75.

In the city, the population was spread out, with 16.6% under the age of 18, 7.7% from 18 to 24, 32.2% from 25 to 44, 27.6% from 45 to 64, and 15.9% who were 65 years of age or older. The median age was 40.3 years. For every 100 females, there were 94.2 males. For every 100 females age 18 and over, there were 92.6 males.

For the period 2010–2014, the city's estimated median annual household income was $67,679, and the median family income was $90,208. Male full-time workers had a median income of $58,441 versus $45,683 for females. The city's per capita income for the city was $42,724. About 4.0% of families and 7.6% of the population were below the poverty line, including 6.9% of those under age 18 and 7.1% of those age 65 or over.

== Economy ==
Heinemann USA is based in Portsmouth. Before its dissolution, Boston-Maine Airways (Pan Am Clipper Connection), a regional airline, was also headquartered in Portsmouth.

=== Top employers ===
According to the city's 2020 Comprehensive Annual Financial Report, the top ten employers in the city were:

#	Employer	Employees
1	US Dept of State Consular Center	1,300
2	Lonza Biologics	1,100
3	Liberty Mutual	1,000
4	HCA Hospital	1,000
5	City of Portsmouth	817
6	Bottomline Technologies	638
7	John Hancock	400
8	Service Credit Union	378
9	Amadeus	362
10	High Liner Foods	330

== Arts and culture ==
The Portsmouth Downtown Historic District encompasses the city's historic urban core and Market Square. The city has a vibrant restaurant culture. In 2023, The Portsmouth Herald reported that the city had 36,000 restaurant seats for a population of 22,000.

=== Sites of interest ===
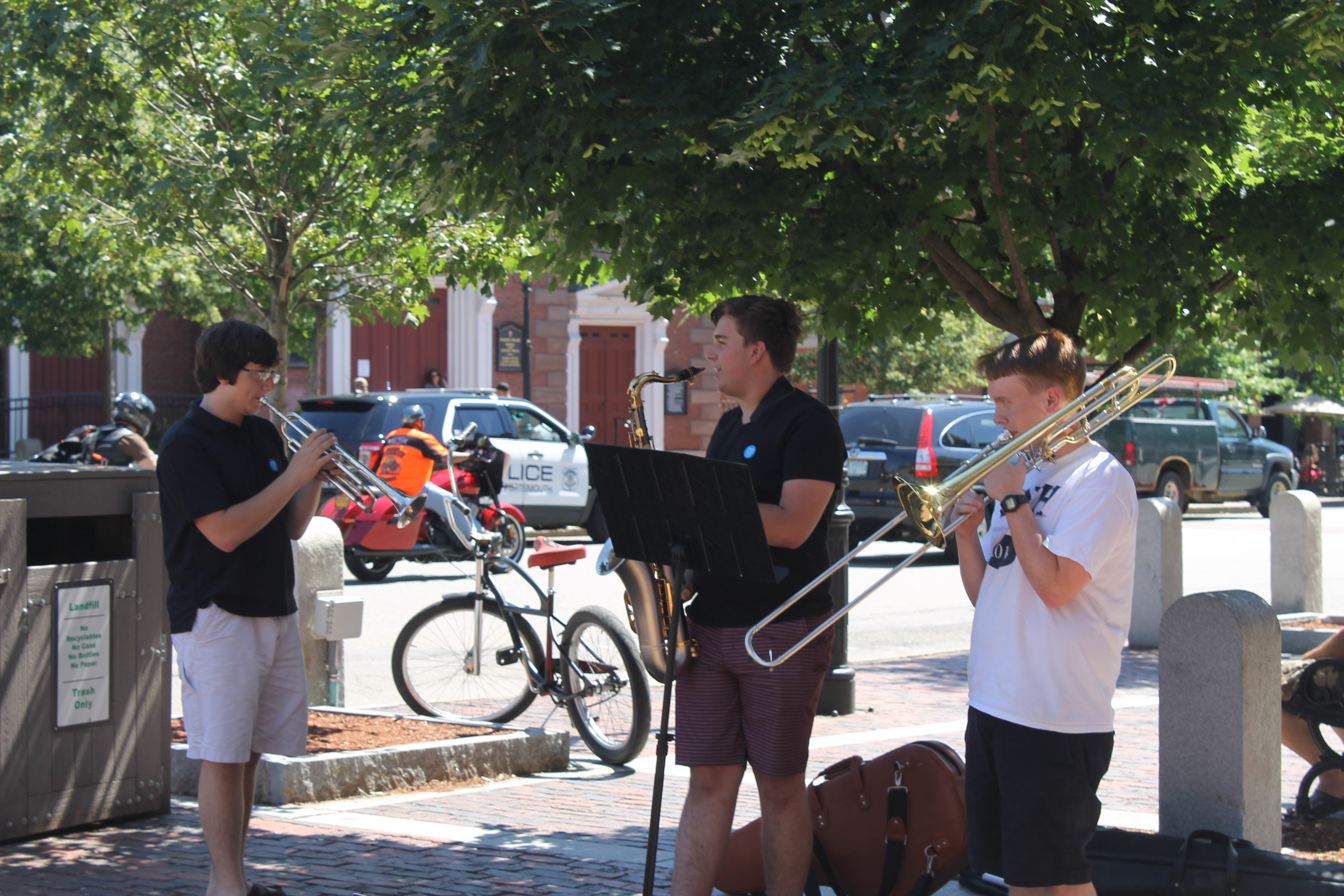
Street musicians perform across from North Church (July 2014)

- USS Albacore Museum & Park – a museum featuring the USS Albacore, a U.S. Navy submarine used for testing, which was decommissioned in 1972 and moved to the park in 1985. The submarine is open for tours.
- Buckminster House – built in 1725, formerly a funeral parlor.
- Cabot Lyford four public sculptures – including "The Whale" and "My Mother the Wind," a seven-ton blank granite statue which was installed on Portsmouth's waterfront in 1975.
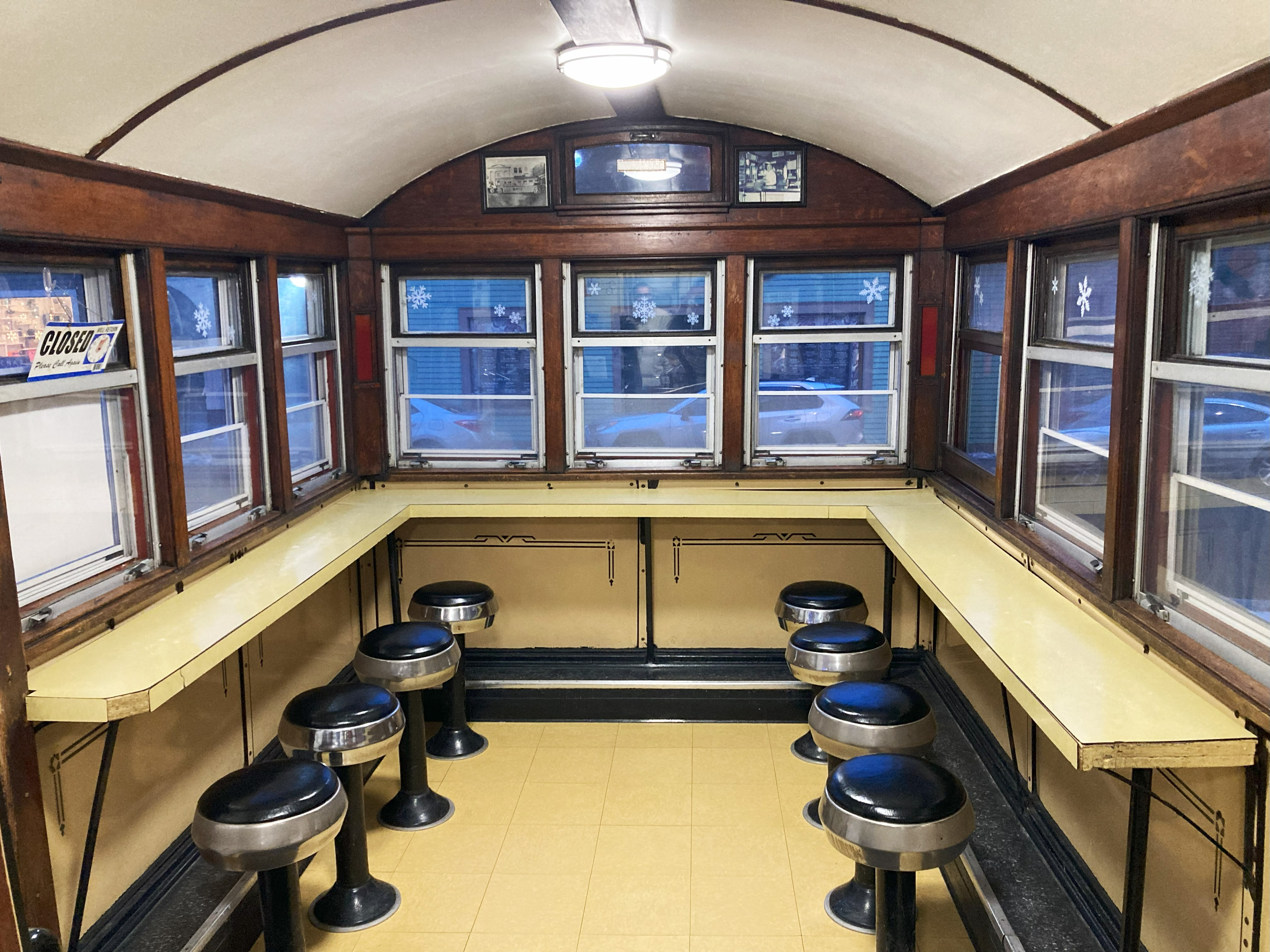
- Interior of Gilley's Diner
  Gilley's Diner – Known as Portsmouth's original diner, established in 1912 as a horse-drawn lunch wagon, and now housed in a 1940s lunch cart permanently located at 175 Fleet Street.
- The Music Hall – a 900-seat theater opened in 1878.
- New Hampshire Theatre Project – founded in 1986, a non-profit theater organization producing contemporary and classical works, and offering educational programs.
- North Church – historic church, the steeple of which is visible from most of Portsmouth.
- The Player's Ring Theater – a black-box theater that produces original work from local playwrights.
- Pontine Theatre – produces original theater works based on the history, culture and literature of New England at their 50-seat black box venue.
- Portsmouth African Burying Ground – a memorial park and the only archeologically verified 18th-century African burying ground in New England.
- Portsmouth Athenæum – a private membership library, museum and art gallery open to the public at certain times.
- Portsmouth Harbor Lighthouse – first established in 1771, the current structure was built in 1878 and is open for monthly tours from May through September.
- Portsmouth Historical Society – founded in 1917, includes museum galleries, a gift shop, welcome center, walking tours, and operates the John Paul Jones House.
- Prescott Park Arts Festival – summer performances in Portsmouth's waterfront park since 1974.
- Rockingham Hotel and the Library Restaurant – historic former hotel and contemporary restaurant. Built in 1885, it is a prominent early example of Colonial Revival architecture.
- Seacoast Repertory Theatre – founded in 1988, a professional theater troupe.
- Strawbery Banke Museum – a neighborhood featuring several dozen restored historic homes in Colonial, Georgian and Federal styles of architecture. The site of one of Portsmouth's earliest settlements.

=== Historic house museums ===
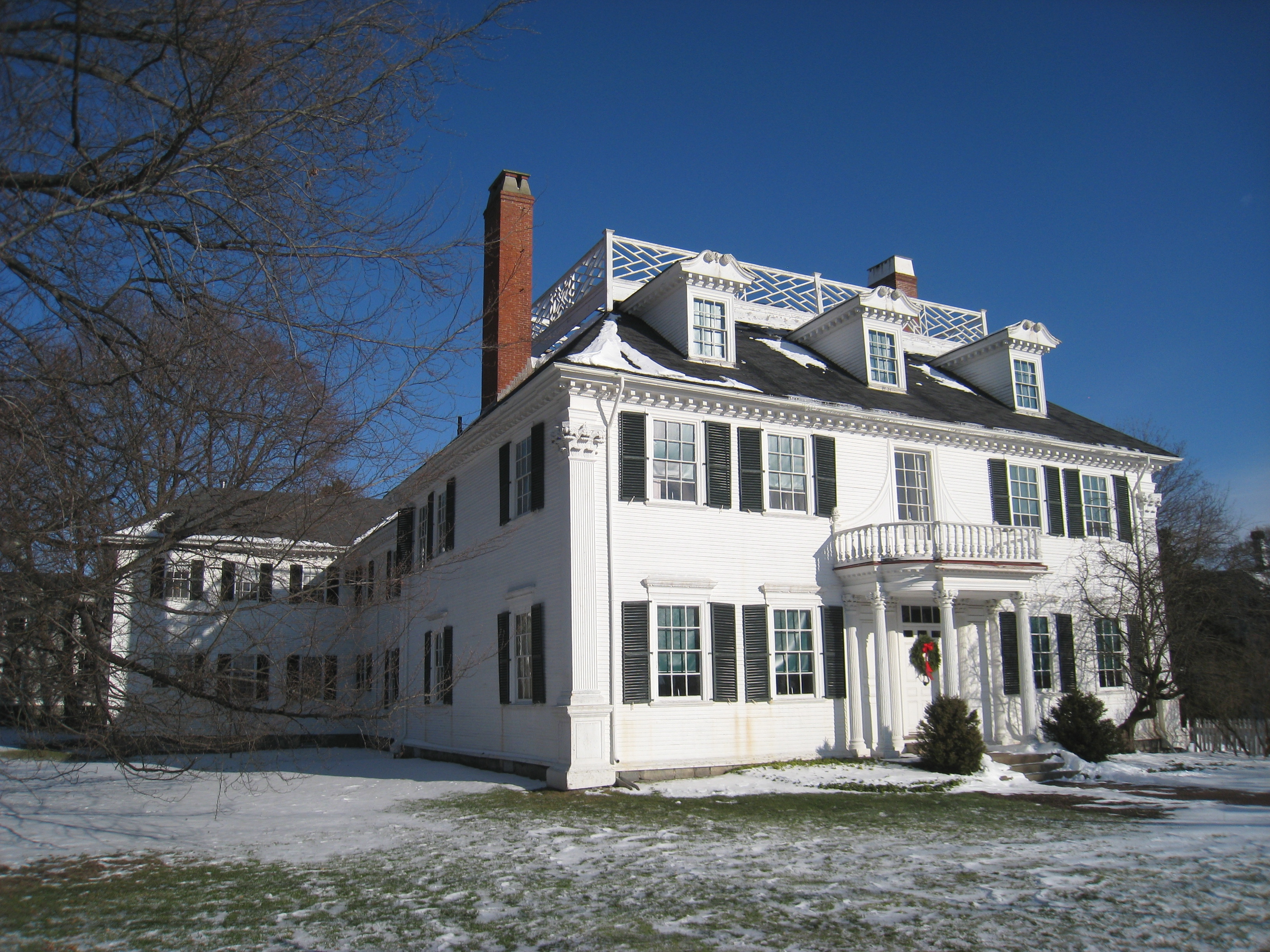
Governor John Langdon House

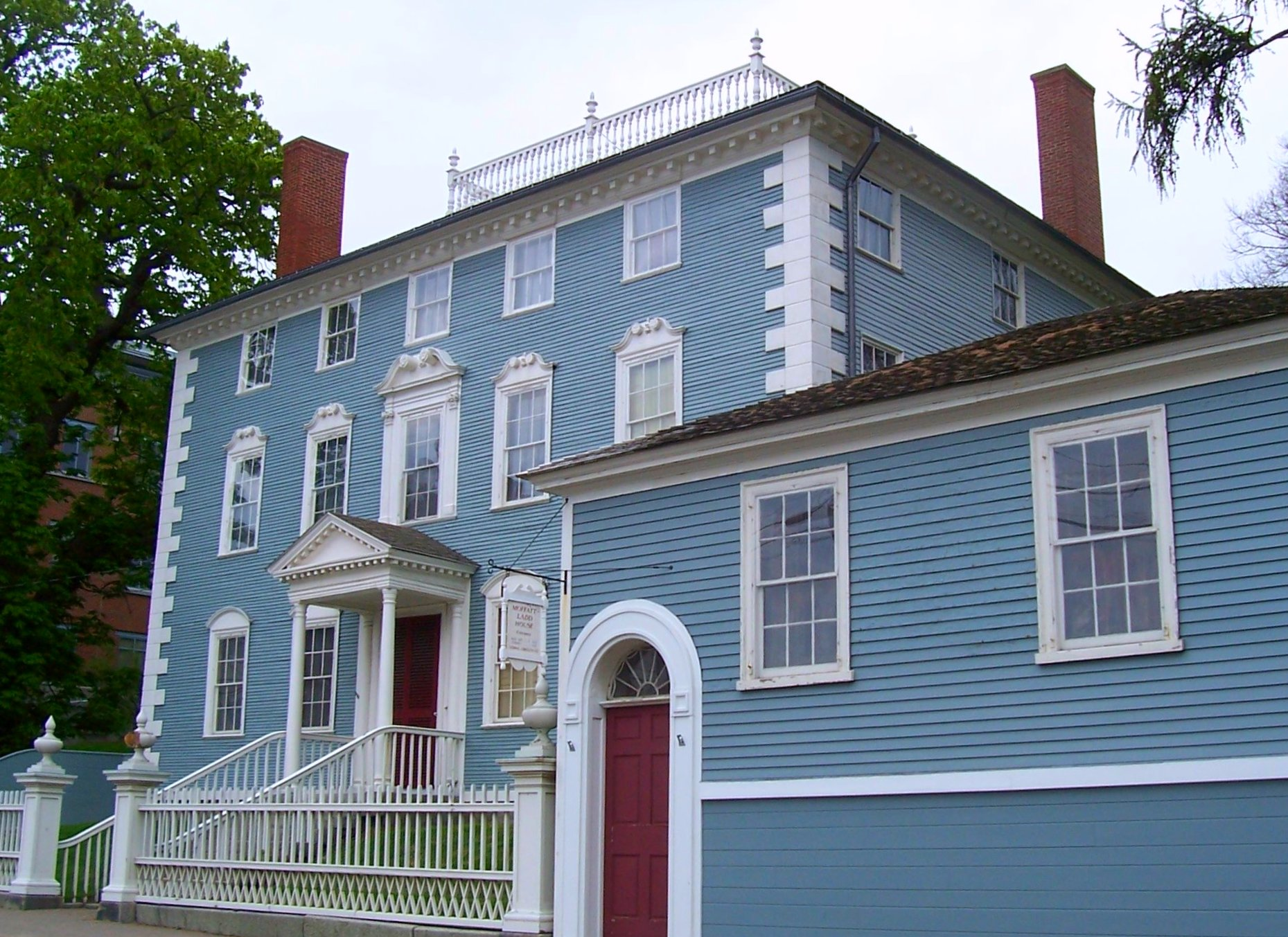
Moffatt-Ladd House

- Richard Jackson House (1664)
- John Paul Jones House (1758)
- Governor John Langdon House (1784)
- Tobias Lear House (1740)
- Moffatt-Ladd House (also called William Whipple House) (1763)
- Rundlet-May House (1807)
- MacPheadris-Warner House (1716)
- Wentworth-Coolidge Mansion (1750)
- Wentworth-Gardner House (also called Wentworth House) (1760)
- Henry Sherburne House (1766)

== Sports ==
Freedom Rugby Football Club is a men's rugby union team based in Portsmouth, founded in the summer of 2014. The club is an active member of USA Rugby and New England Rugby Football Union (NERFU).

== Government ==
The city of Portsmouth operates under a council-manager system of government. Portsmouth elects a nine-member at-large city council to serve as the city's primary legislative body. The candidate who receives the most votes is designated the mayor (currently Deaglan McEachern), while the candidate receiving the second-highest vote total is designated the assistant mayor (currently Joanna Kelley). While the mayor and council convene to establish municipal policy, the city manager (currently Karen Conard) oversees the city's day-to-day operations.

Portsmouth city vote by party in presidential elections
Year	Democratic	Republican	Third parties
2024	69.90% 10,289	28.45% 4,187	1.00% 148
2020	72.53% 10,663	26.09% 3,836	1.37% 202
2016	66.57% 8,911	27.13% 3,632	6.30% 843
2012	67.38% 8,848	31.13% 4,088	1.49% 195
2008	70.19% 9,147	28.62% 3,729	1.19% 155
2004	66.24% 8,436	32.86% 4,185	0.90% 115
2000	59.93% 6,862	34.03% 3,896	6.04% 692
1996	62.03% 6,343	29.47% 3,014	8.50% 869
1992	51.71% 6,132	30.05% 3,563	18.24% 2,163
1988	51.99% 5,377	46.67% 4,827	1.33% 138
1984	46.93% 4,418	52.76% 4,967	0.32% 30
1980	39.60% 3,666	43.46% 4,023	16.94% 1,568
1976	49.89% 4,303	48.34% 4,169	1.77% 153
1972	44.81% 3,656	54.60% 4,455	0.59% 48
1968	53.80% 4,285	42.34% 3,372	3.86% 307
1964	70.43% 5,585	29.57% 2,345	0.00% 0
1960	51.88% 4,687	48.12% 4,348	0.00% 0

Portsmouth is part of New Hampshire's 1st congressional district, currently represented by Democrat Chris Pappas. Portsmouth is part of the Executive Council's 3rd district, currently represented by Republican Janet Stevens. In the State Senate, Portsmouth is represented by Democrat Rebecca Perkins Kwoka. In the State House of Representatives, Portsmouth is divided among the 25th through 31st Rockingham districts.

Politically, Portsmouth is a center of liberal politics and a stronghold for the Democratic Party. Ronald Reagan was the last Republican presidential nominee to carry the city in his 1984 landslide reelection. In 2016, Portsmouth voted 67.70% for Hillary Clinton in the presidential election, 62.53% for Colin Van Ostern in the gubernatorial election, 64.48% for Maggie Hassan in the senatorial election, and 62.16% for Carol Shea-Porter in the congressional election. In 2014, Portsmouth voted 70.05% for Maggie Hassan in the gubernatorial election, 67.34% for Jeanne Shaheen in the senatorial election, and 68.34% for Carol Shea-Porter in the congressional election. In 2012, Portsmouth voted 67.56% for Barack Obama in the presidential election, 70.16% for Maggie Hassan in the gubernatorial election, and 68.50% for Carol Shea-Porter in the congressional election.

In March 2014, Portsmouth became the first municipality in New Hampshire to implement protections for city employees from discrimination on the basis of gender identity, by a 9–0 vote of the city council.

== Education ==
Tertiary institutions:

- Community College System of New Hampshire, Great Bay Community College – Portsmouth campus
- Franklin Pierce University – Portsmouth campus
- Granite State College – Portsmouth campus and on-site location at Great Bay Community College

Portsmouth School District is the public school district of the community:

- Portsmouth High School

Private schools:

- Saint Patrick Academy – Catholic K–8 school

== Media ==
=== Print ===
- The New Hampshire Gazette
- The Portsmouth Herald

=== Radio ===
- WSCA-LP Portsmouth Community Radio 106.1 FM
- WHEB 100.3 FM rock formatted

== Infrastructure ==
=== Transportation ===
The city is crossed by Interstate 95, U.S. Route 1, U.S. Route 4, New Hampshire Route 1A, New Hampshire Route 16, and New Hampshire Route 33. Boston is 55 miles (89 km) to the south, Portland, Maine, is 53 miles (85 km) to the northeast, and Dover, New Hampshire, is 13 miles (21 km) to the northwest.

The Cooperative Alliance for Seacoast Transportation (COAST) operates a publicly funded bus network in the Seacoast region of New Hampshire and neighboring Maine including service in, to and from Portsmouth. C&J Bus Lines is a private intercity bus carrier connecting Portsmouth with coastal New Hampshire and Boston, as well as direct service to New York City. Wildcat Transit, operated by the University of New Hampshire, provides regular bus service to the UNH campus in Durham and intermediate stops. The service is free for students, faculty and staff and $1.50 for the general public. Amtrak's Downeaster train service, is available in Dover and Durham, nearby to the northwest. Allegiant Air offers scheduled airline service from Portsmouth International Airport at Pease (PSM).

== Sister cities ==
Portsmouth's sister cities are:

- Agadir, Morocco
- Carrickfergus, Northern Ireland, United Kingdom
- Kitase, Ghana
- Nichinan, Japan
- Pärnu, Estonia
- Severodvinsk, Russia

Portsmouth also has friendly relations with:

- Portsmouth, England, United Kingdom
- Santarcangelo di Romagna, Italy
- Szolnok, Hungary

== See also ==
- Portsmouth Public Library
- 2006 Little League World Series, when a team from Portsmouth advanced to the quarterfinals
- USS Portsmouth, four ships
