= Saint Patrick Academy =

School in Portsmouth, New Hampshire, US

Coordinates: 43.0430°N 70.7874°E

Location
- 315 Banfield Rd; Portsmouth, New Hampshire 03870; United States

Information
- Motto: Education Fully Alive
- Religious affiliation: Roman Catholic
- Founder: Sisters of Mercy
- Oversight: Hope for Tomorrow Foundation
- Campus: Suburban
- Accreditation: New England Association of Schools and Colleges
- Website: saintpatrickacademy.org

Saint Patrick Academy, formerly known as Saint Patrick's School and Saint Mary's School, is a coeducational, Catholic K–8 school in Portsmouth, New Hampshire. It was founded in 1868, making it the oldest private school in Portsmouth.

== History ==
A Catholic school was founded in Portsmouth, New Hampshire in 1868 by Father Daniel Patrick Murphy and called Saint Mary's School. It served the children of Irish immigrants who moved to the United States during the Great Famine, but it was short-lived. In 1887 Father Eugene O'Callaghan built the school that became Saint Patrick's School on the corner of Winter and Austin Streets at a site near a convent of the Sisters of Mercy, who are an order of nuns specializing in teaching. It was named for Saint Patrick to represent Portsmouth's large Irish American population. The school, whose former primary facility was built in 1904, was part of the Roman Catholic Diocese of Manchester. By 2013, when the school celebrated its 145th anniversary, it was the oldest private school in Portsmouth.

In 2014, Portsmouth city officials notified the school that its facility did not meet modern-day building code, bringing its future into question. Saint Patrick's determined that renovating the building was unfeasible, and in 2016, it announced plans to relocate to a new facility. Under the plan, the school was renamed Saint Patrick Academy and became independent rather than a parochial school; the Hope for Tomorrow Foundation was started to take fiduciary responsibility for it. The groundbreaking for the new facility took place in May 2017, and it opened a year later. The old building was demolished in 2019 to clear the area for a church parking lot. The school opened an additional facility, Saint Sebastian Hall, on its campus in 2021.

== Program ==
Saint Patrick Academy is a K–8 school and is accredited with the New England Association of Schools and Colleges. According to the Portsmouth Herald, 87 percent of students partake in extracurricular activities.
