= Salt Lake Express =

Intercity bus and shuttle company in the western United States

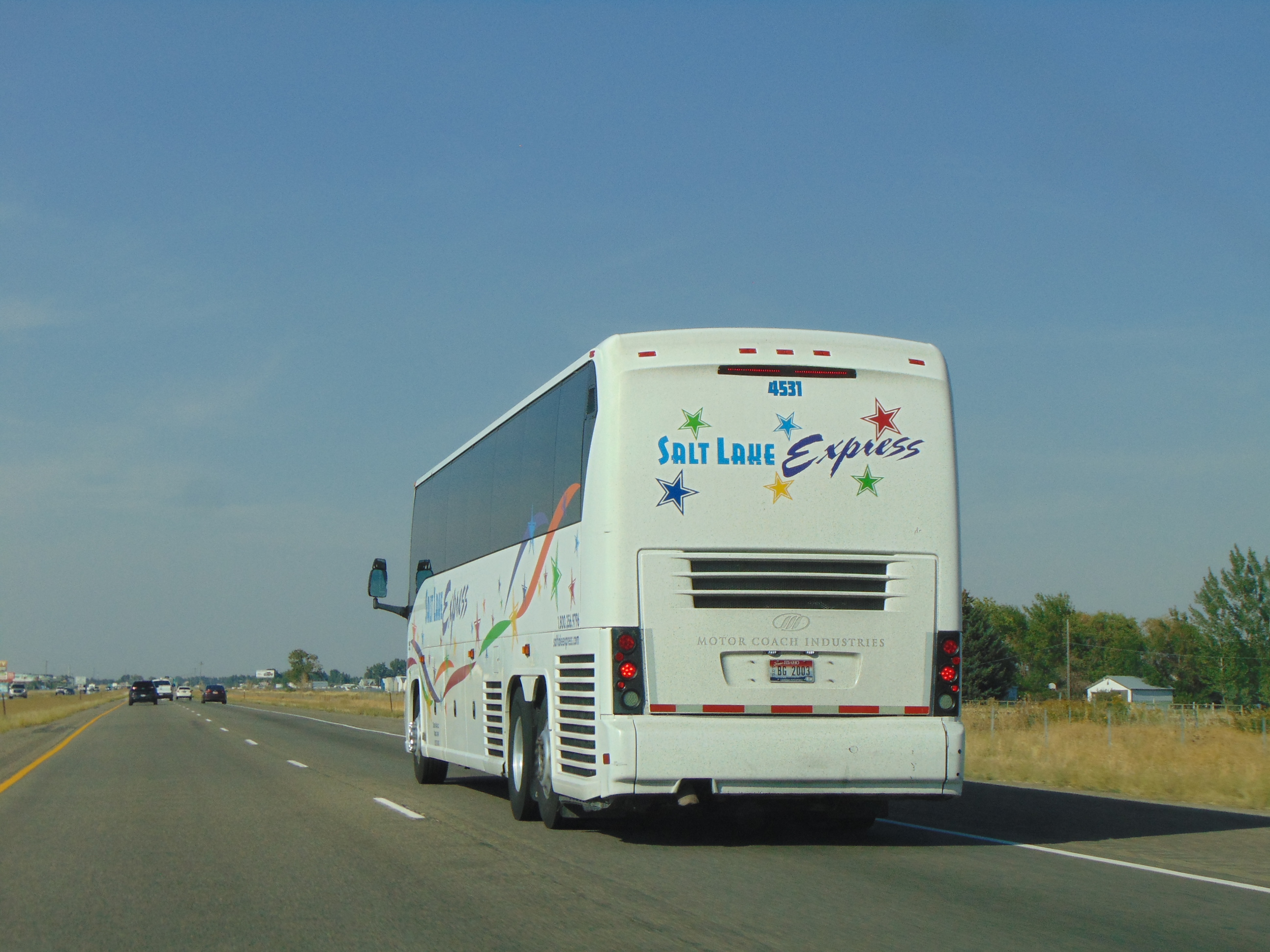
A Salt Lake Express bus on U.S. Route 20 in Idaho

Salt Lake Express is an intercity bus, airport shuttle, and charter bus company in the western United States. The company operates scheduled routes connecting cities, airports, and college towns in Utah, Idaho, Wyoming, Montana, Nevada, and Arizona. It is registered with the Federal Motor Carrier Safety Administration under the legal name Western Trails Charters & Tours LLC, doing business as Salt Lake Express, St. George Express, and Aztec Shuttle.

== History ==
Salt Lake Express began as a shuttle service in 1994 for students at what was then Ricks College in Rexburg, Idaho.

In 2022, Salt Lake Express acquired Northwestern Stage Lines of Spokane, Washington, and Boise-Winnemucca Stages of Boise, Idaho. In 2023, Megabus announced a partnership with Salt Lake Express that made Salt Lake Express routes available through Megabus and expanded Megabus service options in several western states.

== Services ==
Salt Lake Express operates scheduled intercity bus routes, airport shuttle service, campus routes, and charter bus service.

== Regulatory dispute in Nevada ==
In 2023, Salt Lake Express sued the Nevada Transportation Authority after Nevada regulators sought to regulate some of the company's Reno–Las Vegas service as intrastate transportation. The Associated Press reported that U.S. District Judge Robert C. Jones denied the company's request for injunctive relief, ruling that the travel at issue was subject to state regulation.

== See also ==
- Intercity buses in the United States
