= Badger Bus =

Wisconsin intercity bus service

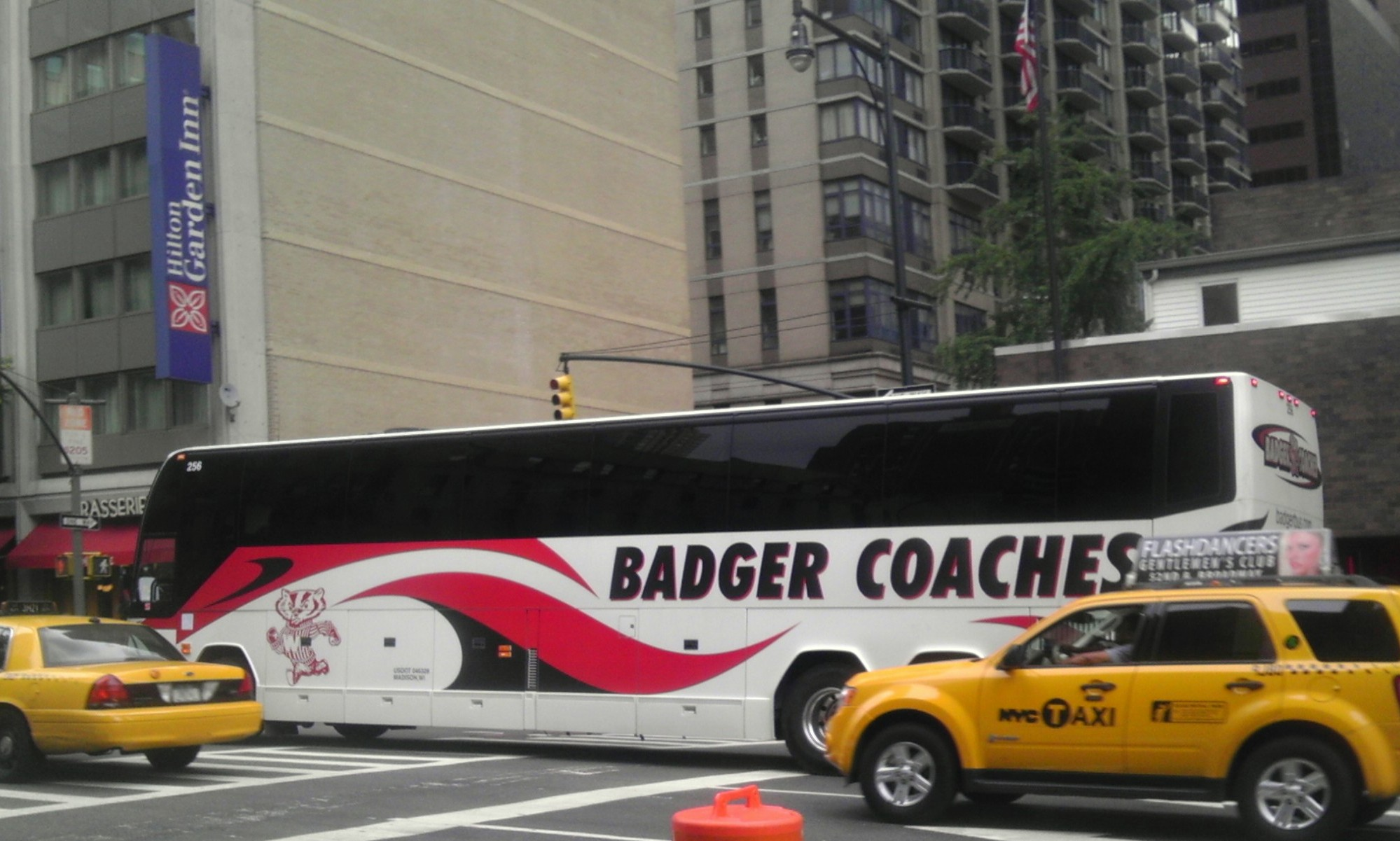
In Manhattan, New York City

The Badger Bus is an intercity bus service operating mainly in Wisconsin by Badger Coaches, Inc. It also offers charters and tours, and operates school buses under contract.

== History ==
Founded in 1920 by Herman E. Meier to provide service between Madison and Monroe, Wisconsin, the company expanded after it was granted permission in 1946 to provide service between Madison and Milwaukee. The company may have also been known as Badger Tour and Travel.

In 2023, Badger Bus lost a contract with the Madison Metropolitan School District to transport its students in school buses.

== Routes ==
Badger Bus mainly provides intercity service from Milwaukee, Wisconsin to Madison, Wisconsin. Badger Bus also provides weekend service from Madison to Minneapolis, Whitewater, and Eau Claire.

== Fleet ==
As of 2015, Badger Bus has 140 vehicles with a combined capacity of 7,000 people.

The Badger Bus fleet consists of several buses:

- Blue Bird Vision
- IC Bus

In 2026, Badger Bus retired its 81-passenger double-decker buses.

== See also ==
- Intercity buses in the United States
- List of bus operating companies
