= Intercity buses in the United States =

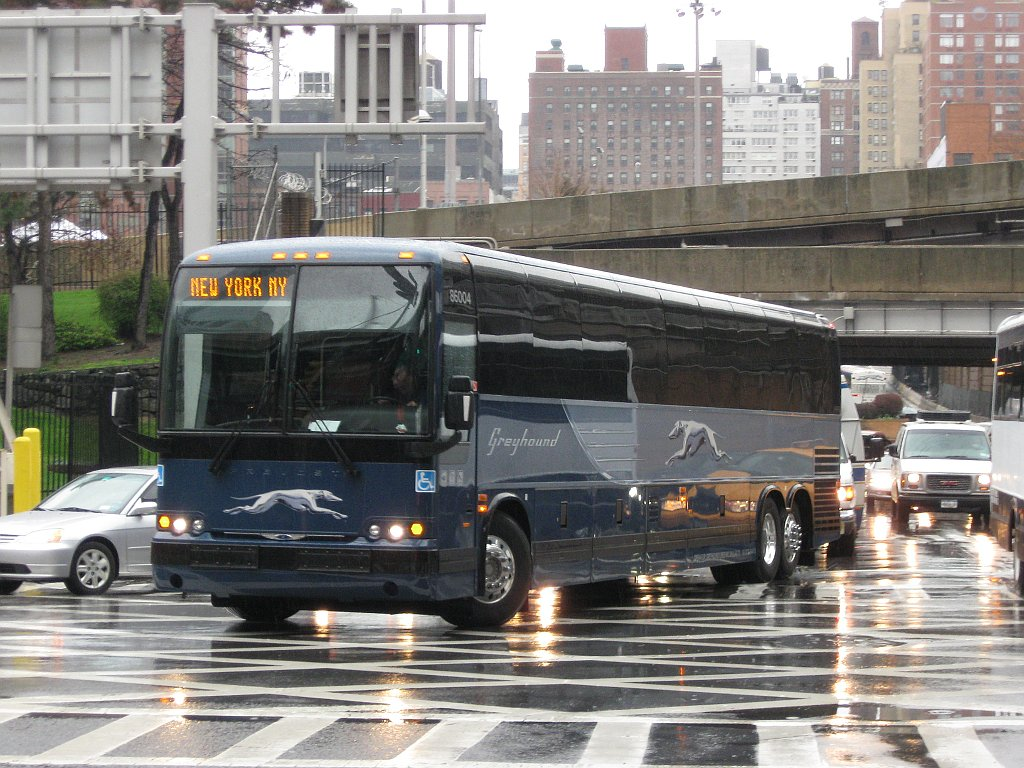
A Greyhound Lines bus arriving in New York City

Intercity buses are an important mode of long-distance, passenger transportation in the United States.

== History ==
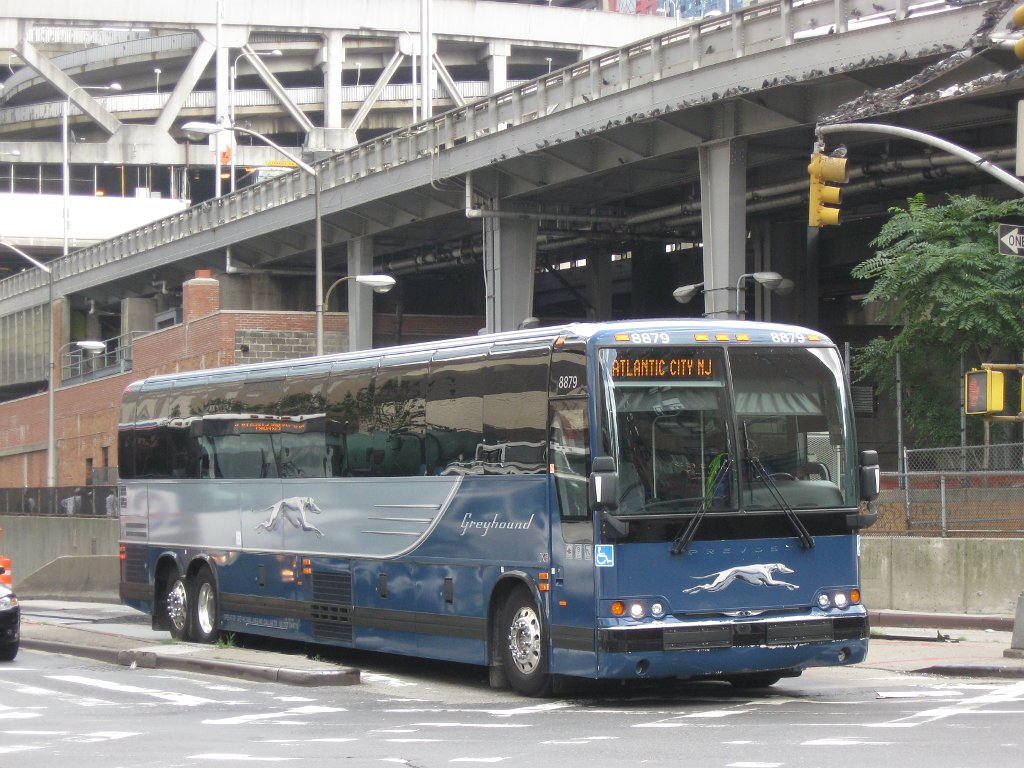
Greyhound Lines intercity bus in New York City

=== Early history ===
The first intercity buses began operations soon after the introduction of the automobile. In the early 1900s, hundreds of independent bus companies arose across the United States. For example, unregulated motorized jitneys were a popular mode of transport for commuters living in cities in New Jersey and working in Philadelphia. Greyhound Lines began operations in Hibbing, Minnesota, in 1914.

In 1929, seven billion passenger miles by intercity bus were recorded.

=== Peak period ===
As with other transportation industries in the United States at the time, intercity bus service was hit hard by the Great Depression. The passage of the Motor Carrier Act of 1935, which amended the Interstate Commerce Act to regulate bus companies as common carriers, sought to help. As part of this legislation, interstate bus operators needed an operating permit from the Interstate Commerce Commission (ICC). They also needed ICC approval before making any changes to fares or entering or departing routes in a specified market, and were required to abide by regulations about safety, finance, insurance, and accounting.

By the mid-1950s, the intercity bus industry, centered on a duopoly of Greyhound Lines and Trailways, had a combined fleet of over 2,000 buses connecting 15,000 cities and towns.

Intercity Greyhound and Trailways buses were also used by the Congress of Racial Equality (CORE) and the Student Nonviolent Coordinating Committee (SNCC) for Freedom Rides in the 1960s. Despite the Interstate Commerce Commission's 1955 ruling in Sarah Keys v. Carolina Coach Company, which stated that Jim Crow laws segregating Black passengers were unlawful on interstate transit, buses in the U.S. South remained effectively fully segregated as of 1961. The Freedom Riders placed interracial pairs in adjoining seats and had Black passengers sit in front (where seats in the South were traditionally reserved for white passengers). Upon leaving from Washington, DC, they traveled south, where hundreds of Freedom Riders were arrested and one bus was firebombed.

=== Mid-century decline ===
The late 1960s, however, saw the beginning of a multi-decade period of decline in the industry, a downturn caused by several concurrent trends. The primary factor was the rapid expansion of private automobile and commercial aviation use for long-distance travel, which siphoned off many travelers. Another was the expansion of urban decay, which made many neighborhoods with bus depots more dangerous. A third was the passage of the Bus Regulatory Reform Act of 1982, which reversed pricing models and market-entry rules introduced by the Motor Carrier Act, allowing carriers to abandon unprofitable routes more easily. While this allowed remaining operators to pivot to heavily traveled routes that generated more revenue, typically those connecting major urban areas along interstate highways, it also led to the widespread abandonment of loss-making services in rural areas. The Bus Regulatory Reform Act also allowed Greyhound to reduce pay for unionized drivers, leading to a weekslong strike by the Amalgamated Transit Union and an eventual 7-15% reduction in wages.

While American intercity buses carried 140 million riders in 1960, this number decreased to 40 million by 1990. By 1997, intercity bus transportation accounted for only 3.6% of travel in the United States. In 1987, the continued deterioration of market conditions led Greyhound to acquire rival Trailways, leaving it as the single carrier operating at the national level.

=== 1990s - 2010s: Curbside resurgence ===
In the late 1990s, Chinatown bus lines that connected Manhattan with Boston and Philadelphia's Chinatowns began operating. They became popular among non-Chinese college students and others seeking inexpensive transportation. Between 1997 and 2007, Greyhound lost 60% of its market share in the Northeastern United States to the Chinatown buses.

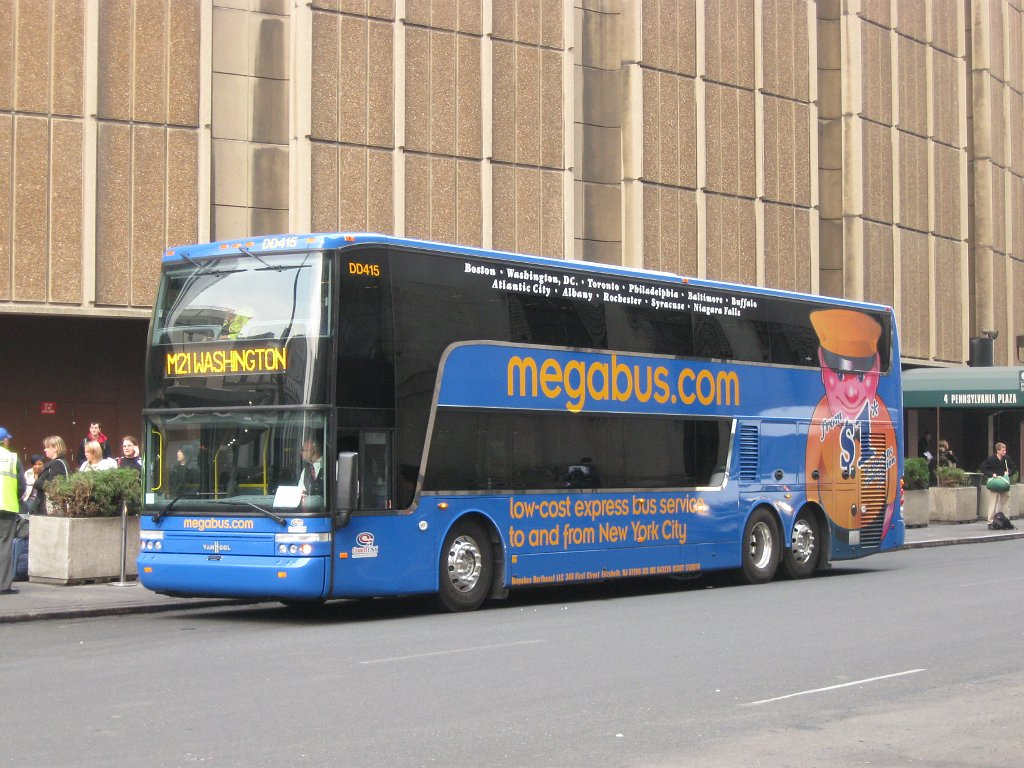
A Megabus arriving at New York Penn Station

During the 2000s, new bus lines such as Megabus and BoltBus emulated the Chinatown buses' practices of low prices and curbside stops on a much larger scale, both in the original Northeast Corridor and elsewhere, while introducing yield management techniques to the industry.

By 2010, curbside buses' annual passenger volume had risen by 33%, and they accounted for more than 20% of all bus trips. One analyst estimated that curbside buses that year carried at least 2.4 billion passenger miles in the Northeast Corridor, compared to 1.7 billion passenger miles for Amtrak trains. Traditional depot-based bus lines also grew, benefiting from what the American Bus Association called "the Megabus effect", and both Greyhound and its subsidiary Yo! Bus, which competed directly with the Chinatown buses, benefited after the federal government shut down several Chinatown lines in June 2012.

Between 2006 and 2014, U.S. intercity buses focused on medium-haul trips of 200 to 300 miles; airplanes handled the bulk of longer trips, and automobiles the shorter ones.

=== 2020s ===
Like other forms of passenger transportation in the United States, the intercity bus industry was severely impacted by the COVID-19 pandemic. During the first months of the pandemic, many scheduled carriers entirely shut down operations while those that continued to operate at less than 25% capacity. The industry additionally received little direct aid from the 2021 CARES Act, which provided financial support to companies operating other modes of transportation. By 2021, the number of scheduled services was estimated to be just 30% of its pre-pandemic level.

Between 2019 and 2020, the number of FMCSA-registered motor coaches declined from 2,978 to 1,450, with a rebound of only about 100 new carriers by 2022. A similar trend was found by the American Bus Association, which claimed that approximately 25% of all pre-pandemic carriers (including BoltBus) had closed by the end of 2021.

When Greyhound itself was purchased by the Munich-based FlixBus in 2021, bus stations were not included in the acquisition, and were instead sold to an investment firm. This led to station closures in Houston, Oakland, Charlottesville, Oakland, Cincinnati, and Philadelphia. Management of intercity bus terminals has since been taken over and expanded by municipal governments. In 2025, the City of Dallas funded a new intercity bus station, and Boston also expanded the capacity of the bus terminal at South Station. In 2026, the city of Philadelphia renovated and reopened the former Greyhound terminal on Filbert street, with plans to lease the space for 10 years. The Chicago City Council also voted to purchase and modernize the city's former Greyhound bus terminal, enabling intercity bus transit to continue into the future.

== Major carriers ==
=== Active ===
- All Aboard America
- Badger Bus
- Barons Bus Lines
- Bay Runner Shuttle
- Birnie Bus Service
- Coach USA
- Concord Coach Lines
- C&J Bus Lines
- Delta Bus Lines
- Express Arrow
- FlixBus / Greyhound Lines
- Fullington Tours
- Indian Trails
- International Express
- International Bus Lines
- Jefferson Lines
- Limousine Express
- Limousine de Mexico
- Megabus
- Mexicoach
- Miller Transportation
- Northwestern Stage Lines
- OurBus
- Pacific Crest Bus Lines
- Peter Pan Bus Lines
- Rapid Connection
- Salt Lake Express
- Sunway Charters
- Trailways Transportation System
- Trans-Bridge Lines
- Tufesa
- Vamoose Bus
- Van Galder Bus Company
- Vermont Translines

=== Former ===
- BoltBus
- Burlington Trailways
- Limoliner
- Orange Belt Stages
- Stagecoach Group

== Public funding ==
=== State-supported services ===
The Federal Transit Administration assists with intercity bus services through its Formula Grants for Rural Areas program (5311), which provides funding to states and federally recognized Indian Tribes to support bus operators in rural areas. The 5311 Program requires recipient states to spend at least 15% of their annual funds on developing and supporting intercity bus transportation, unless they can certify that their state has no unmet intercity bus needs.

Several states use these funds to support statewide intercity bus networks, contracting with local or regional bus operators to provide dedicated, scheduled service to communities within their states. Examples include:

- Bustang (Colorado)
- North Carolina Intercity Bus Service
- GoBus (Ohio)
- POINT Intercity Bus Service (Oregon)
- PennDOT Intercity Bus
- Virginia Breeze
- Travel Washington

== Data and statistics ==
Information and statistics on intercity bus travel in the United States are available from several public sources. Data on publicly-operated intercity services is available from the Federal Transit Administration's National Transit Database. The American Bus Association also performs an annual Motorcoach Census, which includes metrics on scheduled intercity coach operations.

A leading center for academic research on the industry is the Chaddick Institute at DePaul University in Chicago, Illinois.

=== Network ===
Since 2017, the Bureau of Transportation Statistics has maintained the Intercity Bus Atlas, a web map of scheduled intercity passenger bus services in the United States.

== Safety ==
Interstate intercity bus operators in the United States must comply with Federal Motor Carrier Safety Administration regulations.

=== Incidents ===
On August 4, 1952, Greyhound Lines had its deadliest crash when two Greyhound buses collided head-on along then-U.S. Route 81 near Waco, Texas. The fuel tanks of both buses then ruptured, bursting into flames. Of the 56 persons aboard both coaches, 28 were killed, including both drivers.

On May 9, 1980, a freight ship collided with the Sunshine Skyway Bridge, resulting in several vehicles, including a Greyhound bus, falling into Tampa Bay. All 26 people on the bus perished, along with nine others. This is the largest loss of life on a single Greyhound coach to date.

On March 5, 2010, a bus operated by Tierra Santa Inc. crashed on Interstate 10 in Arizona, killing six and injuring sixteen passengers. The bus was not carrying insurance and had also been operating illegally because the company had applied for authority to operate an interstate bus service, but had failed to respond to requests for additional information.

== Security ==
Though generally rare, incidents have occurred over time involving both drivers and passengers on intercity buses.

On May 14, 1961, a pro-segregation mob attacked interstate buses carrying Freedom Riders in Anniston and Birmingham, Alabama. The Ku Klux Klan planned the attack based on knowledge of the Freedom Ride route, and were enabled local police who promised no arrests would be made if the Freedom Riders were attacked or killed. The FBI also had prior knowledge of the planned attacks, but did not inform the Freedom Riders or anyone else within the civil rights movement. No Freedom Riders were killed, but several people required hospitalization.

On October 3, 2001, Damir Igric, a passenger on a Greyhound bus, slit the throat of the driver (who survived his injuries and was hospitalized) and tried to take control of the bus, resulting in a crash that killed 7 passengers, including Igric, and injured six other passengers.

On September 30, 2002, another Greyhound driver was assaulted near Fresno, California, resulting in two passenger deaths after the bus then rolled off an embankment and crashed. Following this attack, driver shields were installed on most Greyhound buses that now prevent passengers from directly having contact with the driver while the bus is in motion, even if the shield is forced open. On buses which do not have the shield, the seats directly behind the driver are generally off limits.

On February 3, 2020, a shooting occurred on a Greyhound bus on Interstate 5, north of Los Angeles, while driving between Los Angeles and San Francisco. One person died, and five were injured.

== See also ==
- Bus station
- Intercity bus driver
- Amtrak Thruway
- Greyhound Lines
