= American Bus Association =

American trade association

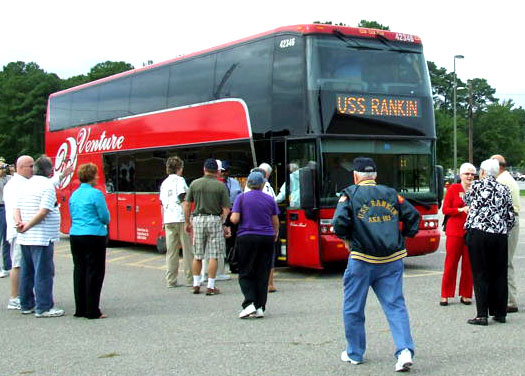
A tour group boarding their bus. Technically speaking, it is a motorcoach.

The American Bus Association (ABA) is a trade association for motorcoach operators and tour companies in the United States and Canada. The membership of the association consists of about 1,000 companies that operate buses or bus-based tours, about 2,800 organizations representing the travel and tourism industry, and several hundred suppliers of buses and related products and services. Its headquarters is located in Washington, D.C.

The organization was founded in 1926 as the Motor Bus Division of the American Automobile Association. It was reorganized in 1930 as the National Association of Motor Bus Operators, and in 1960, it changed its name to the National Association of Motor Bus Owners. It adopted its present name (American Bus Association) in 1977.

== Members ==
Logo of the American Bus Association

The organization has four types of members:

Motorcoach Operators: companies that own motorcoaches and provide privately contracted services such as charters, tours, sightseeing, scheduled service, airport express service, school bus service, and/or local receptive operations. (The membership does not include public transport bus services).

Tour Operators: companies that organize tours without owning equipment. They offer travel packages by arranging for transportation to hotels, attractions and other travel suppliers.

Travel Industry Members: tourism-related companies and organizations that work in partnership with the North American motorcoach industry. They include travel and tourism companies, convention and visitor bureaus, destination marketing organizations, accommodations, attractions, food service organizations, and tourism service professionals such as receptive operators who specialize in tour planning for a local area.

Associate Members: manufacturers and suppliers of buses and bus-related products and services.

== Major activities ==
The ABA provides networking and business development opportunities, government advocacy, and information about the industry. It works to connect members in several segments of the motorcoach, tour, and travel communities.

Specific activities include the following:

ABA Annual Meeting & Marketplace: Holds an annual convention, attended by delegates of the group travel industry. It is held in a different city each year, with a typical attendance of about 3,000 people. The meeting presents an annual opportunity for members of the group travel and motorcoach industry to build business relationships, view new products and services, learn about the latest industry trends, and develop personal networks. The Marketplace includes a series of face-to-face, prescheduled, seven-minute appointments between attendees. Other Marketplace events include professional education seminars, exhibits provided by suppliers, and familiarization tours of attractions in the host city.

Bus Industry Safety Council: The Bus Industry Safety Council is dedicated to elevating safety standards within the intercity bus and motorcoach industry.

Bus Maintenance & Repair Council: The Bus Maintenance and Repair Council (BusMARC) fulfills the imperative for ongoing maintenance education and compliance training. Additionally, it serves as a platform for interaction between equipment, parts, and service providers in the bus industry.

Entertainer Motorcoach Council: The Entertainer Motorcoach Council is concerned with entertainer coaches engaged in charter or lease operations.

Hispanic Motorcoach Council: The Hispanic Motorcoach Council endeavors to promote the continued growth, fellowship, and development of the Hispanic business community in the motorcoach industry. It will do this by serving as a resource center and forum to promote safe motorcoach operations, encourage interaction among operators and transportation planners, and advocate for Hispanic and minority-owned businesses.

Women in Buses Council: According to the ABA website, the mission of the Women in Buses Council is to recognize and advance the role of women in the motorcoach industry through networking, education, and mentoring programs.

Publications: The ABA publishes Destinations magazine for the tour and travel industry, including the annual Best of the Best issue, and The Insider, a biweekly newsletter for members and subscribers. The ABA compiles and distributes The ABA Motorcoach Marketer, an annual member directory and travel guide. The ABA also publishes Marketplace Today, which is the official publication of the ABA's Annual Meeting & Marketplace.

Continuing Education: Sponsors the Certified Travel Industry Specialist (CTIS) program, providing motorcoach and group travel professionals with industry-specific education and credentialing. The education is provided through correspondence courses at Indiana University – Purdue University Indianapolis and attendance at specialized ABA educational seminars. The ABA conducts webinars online, and educational talks and seminars at its annual Marketplace event.

Awards: Sponsors a Lifetime Achievement Award for individuals who have made major contributions to the motorcoach, tourism, and hospitality industry, and a Kaleidoscope Award for individuals or organizations that have directly impacted the advancement of diversity within the industry.

Code of Ethics: Sponsors a code of ethics for its members. The code was adopted to promote and maintain high standards of business and personal conduct. Its ten points cover general business integrity and several specific items of financial behavior.

Government Affairs: Represents the industry before elected officials and regulatory bodies. Monitors pertinent legislative and regulatory activity, and keeps members informed of developments in these areas. These activities have helped in securing Americans with Disabilities Act grants to assist coach operators in equipping coaches with wheelchair lifts, and Transportation Security Administration funds in support of industry efforts to improve security measures for drivers and passengers.

== Affiliated organizations ==
The ABA sponsors the ABA Foundation, which funds research, scholarships, and internships related to its mission. It supports BUSPAC, a political action committee that works to advance the interests of the industry and the traveling public.

The ABA maintains strategic partnerships with about 20 other industry organizations and a similar number of state and provincial bus associations.

== See also ==
- Charabanc
- Double-decker bus
- Intercity bus service in the United States
- Roadside attraction
- Sleeper bus
- Tour bus service
- Tour guide
- Tourist destination
- Tourist trap
- Travel behavior
