= Franklin Block =

Franklin Block may refer to:

- Franklin Block (Brockton, Massachusetts)
- Franklin Block (Portsmouth, New Hampshire), a National Register of Historic Places listing in Rockingham County, New Hampshire
