= Reuben Lamprey Homestead =

Historic house in New Hampshire, United States

- U.S. National Register of Historic Places
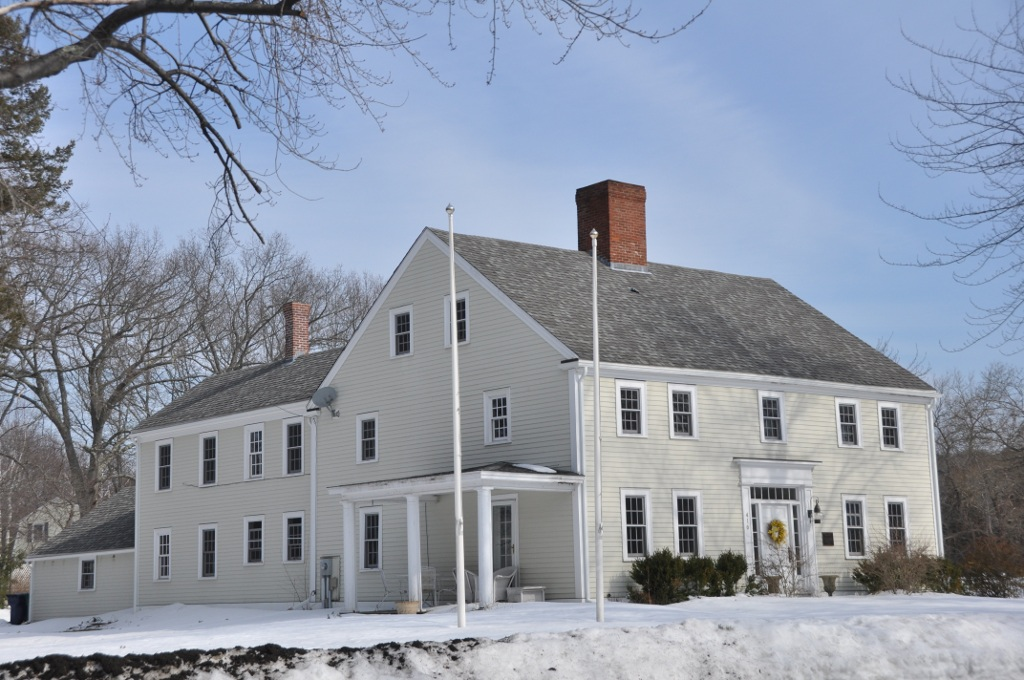

- Location within New Hampshire Location within the United States
- Location: 416 Winnacunnet Rd., Hampton, New Hampshire
- Coordinates: 42°55′51″N 70°48′46″W
- Area: 1.2 acres (0.49 ha)
- Architectural style: Colonial
- NRHP reference No.: 82000624
- Added to NRHP: November 9, 1982

The Reuben Lamprey Homestead is a historic house at 416 Winnacunnet Road in Hampton, New Hampshire. Built in the 1770s, the property is the best-preserved colonial-era farm complex in the town. It was listed on the National Register of Historic Places in 1982.

== Description and history ==
The Reuben Lamprey Homestead is located on the north side of Winnacunnet Road, a busy east–west through road, between Presidential Circle and Nathaniel Way. The main house is a 2 1/2-story wood-frame structure, with a side-gable roof, center chimney, and clapboarded exterior. The main facade is symmetrical, with five bays, and is simply trimmed except for the centered entrance. That is flanked by sidelight windows and recessed paneled pilasters, and is topped by a seven-light transom window and entablature. Extending to the rear of the main block are two ells, both now of 20th-century origin. A timber-framed barn stands beyond and to the right of the house.

The main house was built in the 1770s by Reuben Lamprey, descendant of one of the area's early settlers. The house, and the accompanying period barn, have seen only relatively modest alterations since their construction. The principal alterations have been the replacement of the ells, and repair work on the barn, which partially collapsed due to neglect in the 20th century. It was restored and used for a time as a well-known local antique shop. The property was sold out of the Lamprey family in 1881.

== See also ==
- National Register of Historic Places listings in Rockingham County, New Hampshire
