= Woodman Road Historic District =

Historic district in New Hampshire, United States

- U.S. National Register of Historic Places
- U.S. Historic district
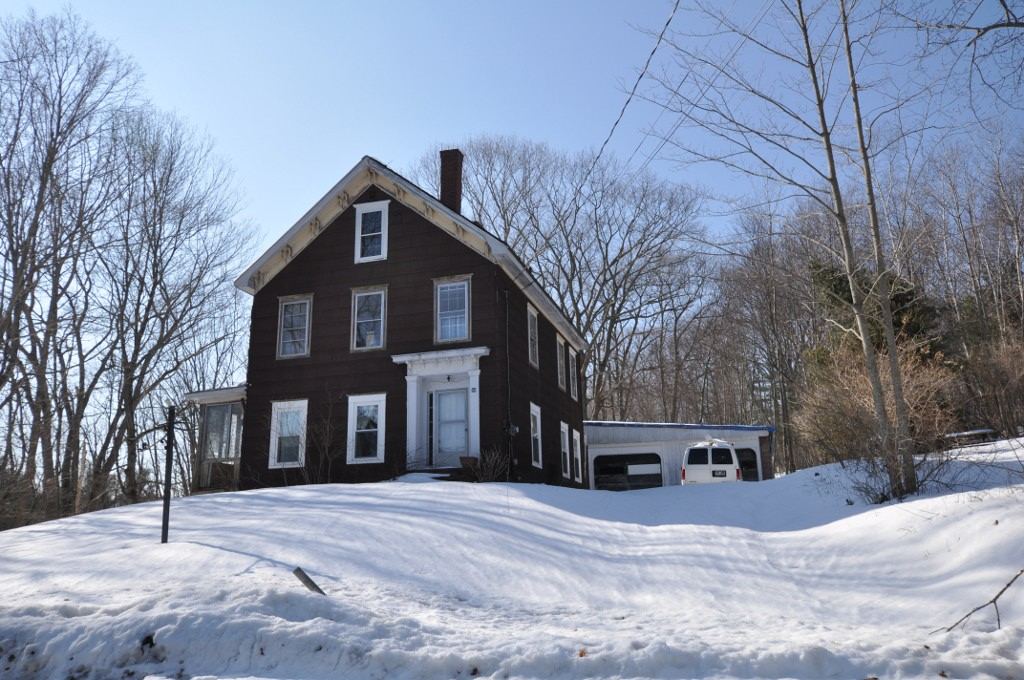
- The Cornwell House

- Location within New Hampshire Location within the United States
- Location: Woodman Rd., South Hampton, New Hampshire
- Coordinates: 42°53′11″N 70°56′21″W
- Area: 6.5 acres (2.6 ha)
- Built: 1830
- Architectural style: Greek Revival
- MPS: South Hampton MRA
- NRHP reference No.: 83001152
- Added to NRHP: April 11, 1983

The Woodman Road Historic District of South Hampton, New Hampshire, is a small rural residential historic district consisting of two houses on either side of Woodman Road, a short way north of the state line between New Hampshire and Massachusetts. The Cornwell House, on the west side of the road, is a Greek Revival wood-frame house built c. 1850. Nearly opposite stands the c. 1830 Verge or Woodman House, which is known to have been used as a meeting place for a congregation of Free Will Baptists between 1830 and 1849.

The district was listed on the National Register of Historic Places in 1983.

== Cornwell House ==
The Cornwell House is a 2 1/2-story wood-frame structure, set on a rise overlooking the road. It has a front-facing gable roof and clapboarded exterior. Its main facade is three bays wide, with the entrance set in a recess in the right bay. The building corners are pilastered, and the roof gable exhibits paired Italianate brackets. A three-season porch is set on the right side, and a pair of ells extend to the rear, connecting to a modern garage.

== Verge House ==
The Verge House is also a 2 1/2-story wood-frame structure, and is set facing south nearer the road than the Cornwell House. It is three bays wide, with a side-gable roof and shingled exterior. A single-story shed-roof section projects along the width of the main facade, with the entrance recessed under a porch in the leftmost section. A 1 1/2-story ell extends to the east, and the property also includes a 19th-century barn and 25 acres (10 ha) of former farmland.

== See also ==
- National Register of Historic Places listings in Rockingham County, New Hampshire
