= Shapley Town House =

Historic house in New Hampshire, United States

- U.S. National Register of Historic Places
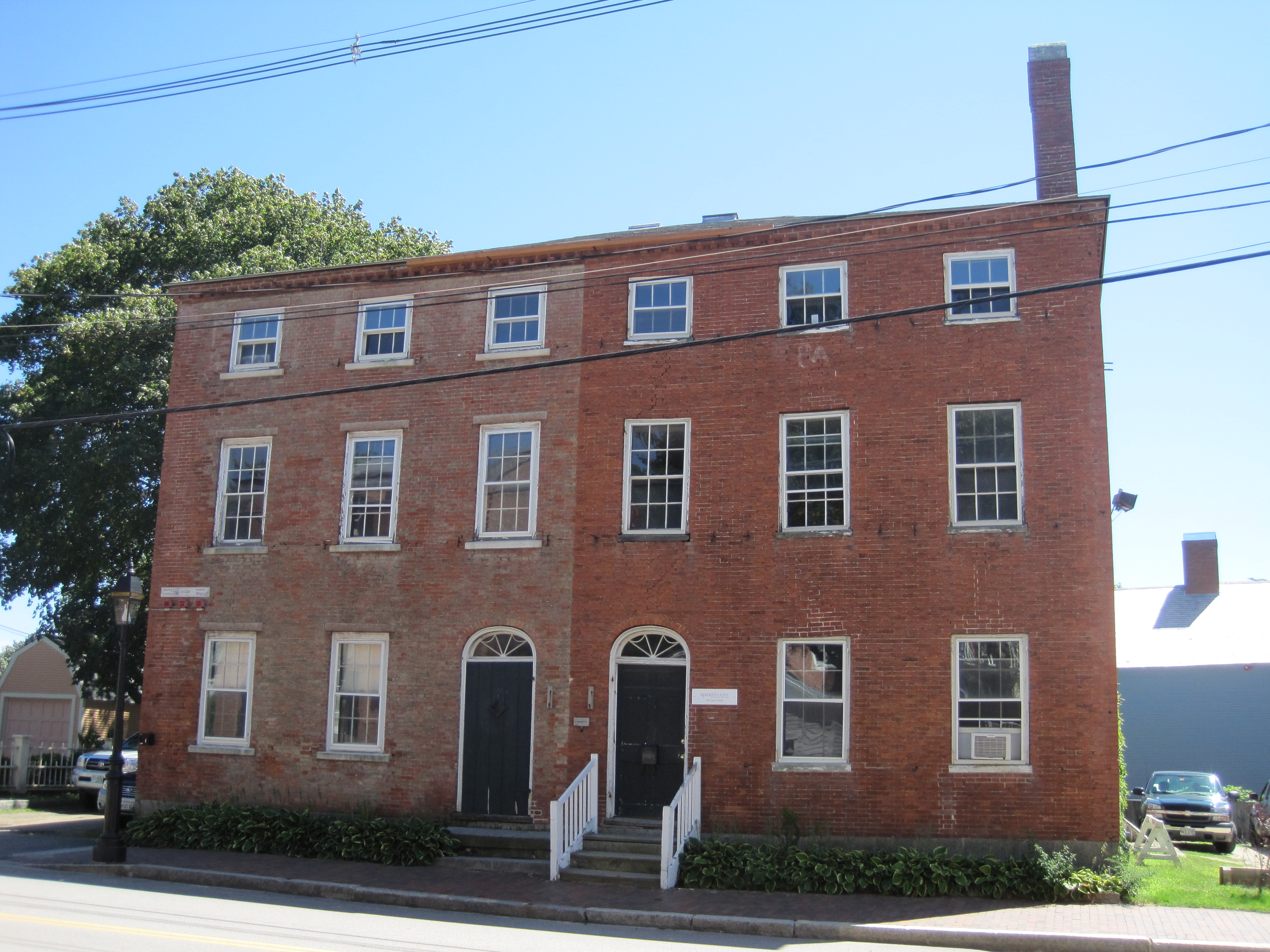

- Location within New Hampshire Location within the United States
- Location: 454-456 Court St., Portsmouth, New Hampshire
- Coordinates: 43°4′37″N 70°45′12″W
- Area: 0.1 acres (0.040 ha)
- Built: 1815
- NRHP reference No.: 73000173
- Added to NRHP: February 28, 1973

The Shapley Town House, also known as the Reuben Shapley House, is a historic house at 454-456 Court Street in Portsmouth, New Hampshire. Built about 1815, it is unusual in the city as a particularly well-preserved example of a Federal period double house. The house was listed on the National Register of Historic Places in 1973. It is owned by the Strawbery Banke Foundation.

== Description and history ==
The Shapley House is located southeast of downtown Portsmouth, on the south side of Court Street between Atkinson and Marcy streets. It is a three-story structure, built with load-bearing brick walls. Its front facade is six bays wide, with a symmetrical arrangement that has entrances in the two center bays, topped by semi-elliptical fanlights. Windows are six-over-six sash on the lower two floors, and three-over-three on the third. The roof cornice exhibits shallow brick corbelling. The "best" rooms of the interior feature delicate Federal period wainscoting, and have mantelpieces supported by six engaged columns.

The house was built c. 1815 by Captain Reuben Shapley, a ship's captain and merchant. Although it was one of a number of brick buildings built in the wake of an 1813 fire that devastated Portsmouth's downtown area, its construction as a double house is distinctive. From the outside it looks like a single-family residence except for its two entrances, an apparently deliberate decision. The halves of the house are separated by a brick firewall extending the full depth and height of the house. Window sills and other trim on one side are in marble, while these elements on the other side are of wood. It is one of the city's best-preserved Federal buildings.

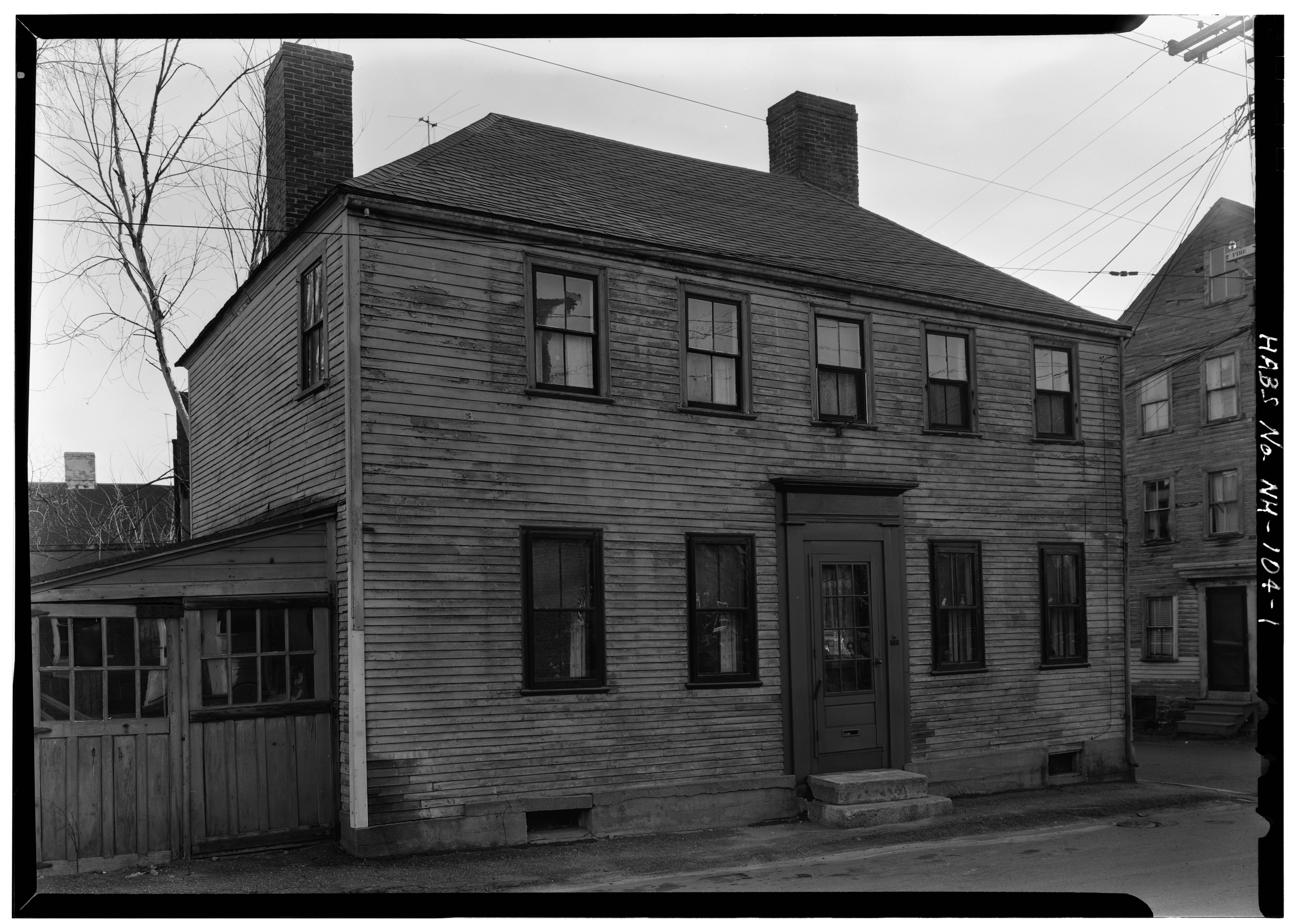
This house at 420 Court St., Portsmouth, New Hampshire, is also known as the Reuben Shapley (who built it) House. It has been restored and is part of the Strawbery Banke Museum complex.

== See also ==
- National Register of Historic Places listings in Rockingham County, New Hampshire
