= Highland Road Historic District =

Historic district in New Hampshire, United States

- U.S. National Register of Historic Places
- U.S. Historic district
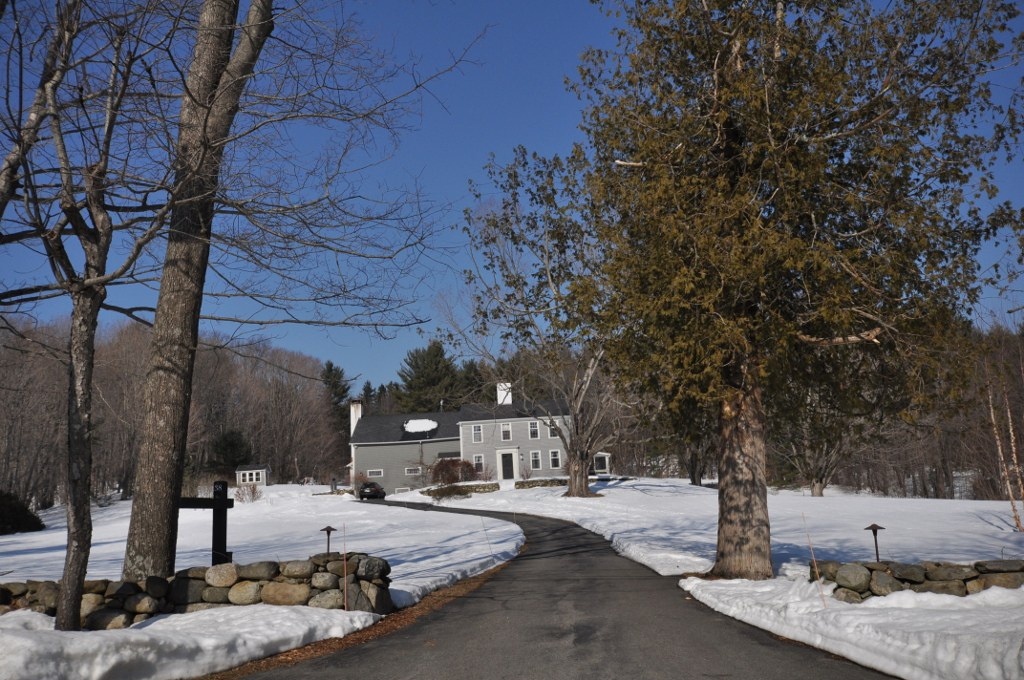
- 38 Highland Road

- Location within New Hampshire Location within the United States
- Location: Highland and Woodman Rds., South Hampton, New Hampshire
- Coordinates: 42°53′43″N 70°56′5″W
- Area: 104.7 acres (42.4 ha)
- Built by: Multiple
- Architectural style: Georgian, Federal
- MPS: South Hampton MRA
- NRHP reference No.: 83001146
- Added to NRHP: April 11, 1983

The Highland Road Historic District is a historic district encompassing a rural neighborhood in South Hampton, Rockingham County, New Hampshire. The historic farm estates which characterize the neighborhood date to the turn of the 18th century. The district was added to the National Register of Historic Places (NRHP) in 1983.

The boundary of the district (according to the map included in the official NRHP nomination) extends from the junction of the Back River and Woodman Road northward along Woodman to the historic Brown Estate on Highland Road, then continues north to the Kensington border (the properties on the north side of Highland Road actually extend into Kensington). From here the boundary runs east to the northern boundaries of the historic Towle Estate, then south again to Towle's Corner on to the Back River again. From here the boundary runs along the river (roughly) westward, back to Woodman Road.

The district encompasses eight farm properties, including well-preserved farmhouses dating from c. 1730 to c. 1800. Several of these houses are located on lots that are substantially similar to their 18th-century outlines, providing a significant link to the area's past. Three of the eight farmhouses were built before 1740, and most predate South Hampton's incorporation as a separate community. There is also a small stone foundation on the south side of Highland Road said to belong to an old schoolhouse, which does not appear in the NRHP nomination.

The present-day neighborhood within and immediately surrounding the district is colloquially called High Town.

== See also ==
- National Register of Historic Places listings in Rockingham County, New Hampshire
