= Haven-White House =

Historic house in New Hampshire, United States

- U.S. National Register of Historic Places
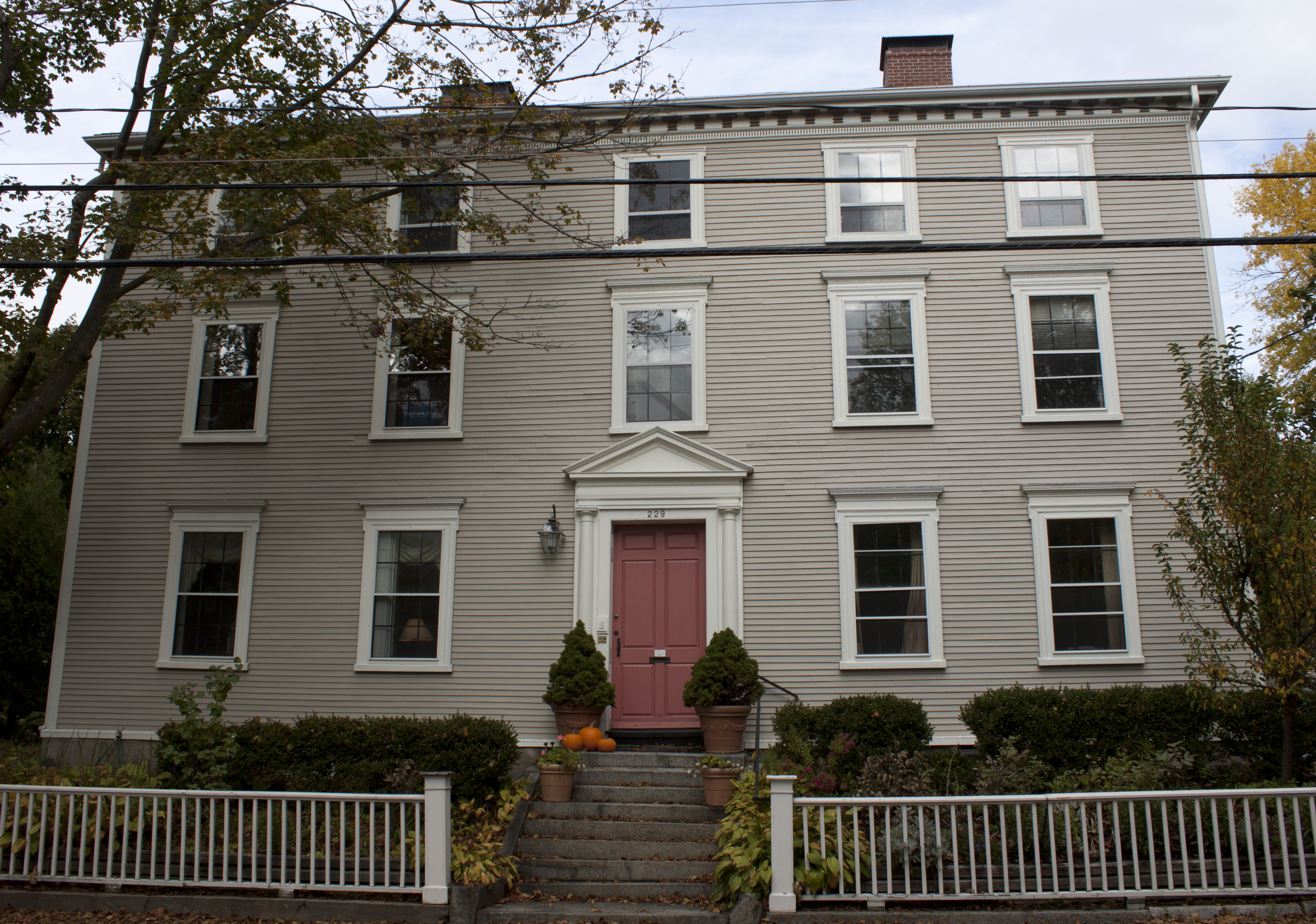

- Location within New Hampshire Location within the United States
- Location: 229 Pleasant St., Portsmouth, New Hampshire
- Coordinates: 43°4′24″N 70°45′17″W
- Area: 0.3 acres (0.12 ha)
- Built: 1799
- Architectural style: Federal
- NRHP reference No.: 85001195
- Added to NRHP: June 6, 1985

The Haven-White House is a historic house at 229 Pleasant Street in Portsmouth, New Hampshire. Built about 1800 for a prosperous merchant, it is an important early example of the city's Federal architecture, with numerous high-quality interior features, and a rare surviving period stable. The property was listed on the National Register of Historic Places in 1985.

== Description and history ==
The Haven-White House is located south of central Portsmouth, on the north side of Pleasant Street at its junction with Richmond Street. It is a three-story wood-frame structure, with a hip roof, interior chimneys, and a clapboarded exterior. A three-story ell projects to the left rear, giving it a facade of similar length facing Richmond Street as its main facade, which faces Pleasant. The main facade is five bays wide, with a center entrance flanked by slender Federal-style engaged columns and topped by a gabled pediment. Windows are topped by shouldered surrounds with slightly projecting caps, and the main eave has dentil moulding encircling the building. The interior retains many high-quality examples of Federal period woodwork, including an extremely rare in situ bust of the poet John Milton. The second-floor southwest bedchamber contains one of the city's most complete expressions of high-style Federal woodwork.

The house was built about 1799 or 1800 for Joseph Haven, a prosperous merchant. The stable at the rear of the property is a two-story building dating to the same period, which includes keystoned arches over its major openings, and a period oculus window.

== See also ==
- National Register of Historic Places listings in Rockingham County, New Hampshire
