= Northwood Congregational Church =

Historic church in New Hampshire, United States

- U.S. National Register of Historic Places
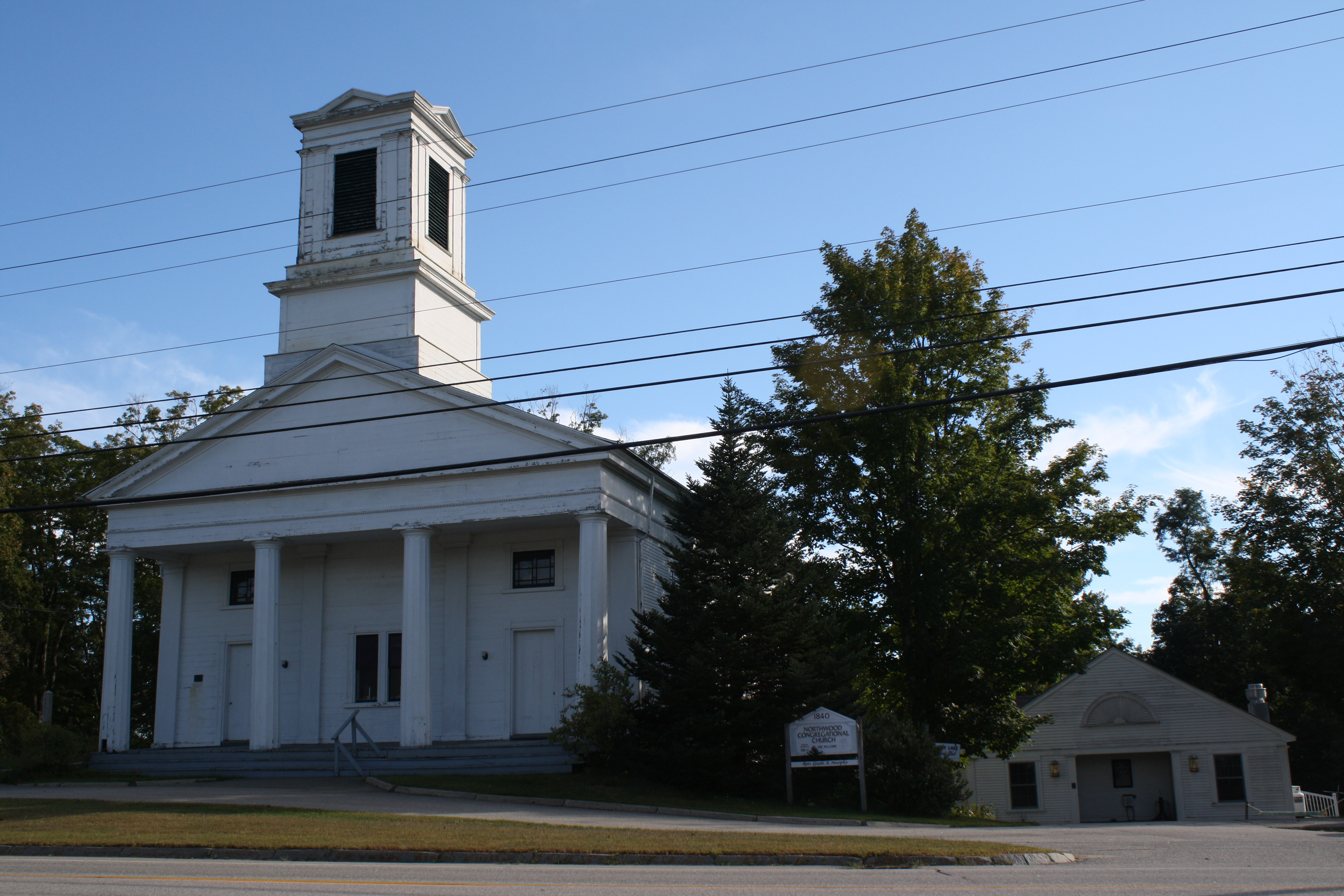

- Location within New Hampshire Location within the United States
- Location: US 4, Northwood, New Hampshire
- Coordinates: 43°13′2″N 71°12′32″W
- Area: 0.5 acres (0.20 ha)
- Built: 1840
- Architect: Tasker, Johnathan; Et al.
- Architectural style: Greek Revival
- NRHP reference No.: 79000208
- Added to NRHP: November 30, 1979

The Northwood Congregational Church is a historic church at 881 1st New Hampshire Turnpike (US 4) in Northwood, New Hampshire. The Greek Revival wood-frame building was built in 1840, and is one of the finest and least-altered Greek Revival churches in the state. The building was listed on the National Register of Historic Places in 1979. The congregation is affiliated with the United Church of Christ.

== Description and history ==
The Northwood Congregational Church is located in the town center of Northwood, on the south side of US Route 4, just east of the Coe-Brown Northwood Academy. It is a single-story wood-frame structure, with a gabled roof and clapboarded exterior. Its main facade is built to resemble a classical Greek temple front, with four fluted columns supporting a full triangular pediment, above a recessed entry. The tympanum of the pediment is flushboarded. The entry facade has two doorways, each flanked by pilasters which stand behind the columns of the facade. The church is topped by a three-stage tower with an 1888 bell.

The church was built in 1840, probably by Jonathan Tasker, a local builder. It was for many years a mainstay of the community, and one of its early pastors, Rev. Elliott Cogswell, was instrumental in establishing the Northwood Academy (now Coe-Brown Northwood Academy). Services were discontinued due to declining participation after World War II, and were revived in the 2000s.

== See also ==
- National Register of Historic Places listings in Rockingham County, New Hampshire
