= John Elkins Farmstead =

Historic house in New Hampshire, United States

- U.S. National Register of Historic Places
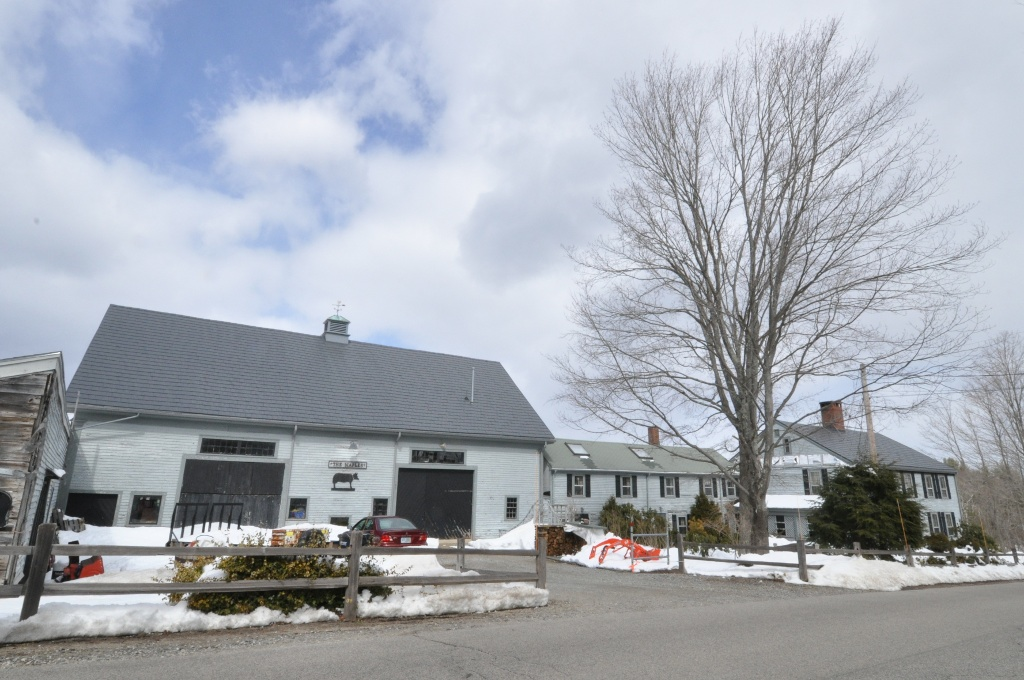

- Location within New Hampshire Location within the United States
- Location: 156 Beach Plain Rd., Danville, New Hampshire
- Coordinates: 42°56′39″N 71°6′7″W
- Area: less than one acre
- Architectural style: Federal
- NRHP reference No.: 96000955
- Added to NRHP: August 30, 1996

The John Elkins Farmstead is a historic farmstead at 155 Beach Plain Road in Danville, New Hampshire, United States. The property includes one of Danville's finest examples of a 19th-century connected farmstead, with buildings dating from the late 18th to late 19th centuries. The property encompassing the farm buildings was listed on the National Register of Historic Places in 1996 (where it is listed at 156 Beach Plain Road).

== Description and history ==
The John Elkins Farmstead is located in rural northeastern Danville, on the north side of Beach Plain Road a short way east of Hillside Terrace. It consists of a main house, with a wing that connects it to a barn; a carriage shed frames the west side of the courtyard formed by these structures, which lie just north of Beach Plain Road. The main house is a 2 1/2-story frame structure with a gabled roof and central chimney. Its centered entry is a 20th-century replacement for what was, by architectural analysis, probably a Federal style surround with sidelights and a fanlight. The interior has been carefully reconstructed in the Federal style, retaining original features where possible, and recreating others from documentary photographs. The barn is an unusually large 2 1/2-story structure with timber framing, and a two sliding front entrances. It is also accessible from the house via the wing on both floors, an unusual arrangement.

The construction date of the farmhouse is not known from documentary sources; architectural evidence suggests it was built in the late 18th century, probably for Jeremiah Elkins, who had recently married. The barn and shed were built by the Elkins' son John, likely in 1875. John Elkins was known as one of Danville's most successful farmers, adapting new technologies and practices as they came about. It was sold out of the Elkins family in 1919.

== See also ==
- National Register of Historic Places listings in Rockingham County, New Hampshire
