= Watson Academy =

- U.S. National Register of Historic Places
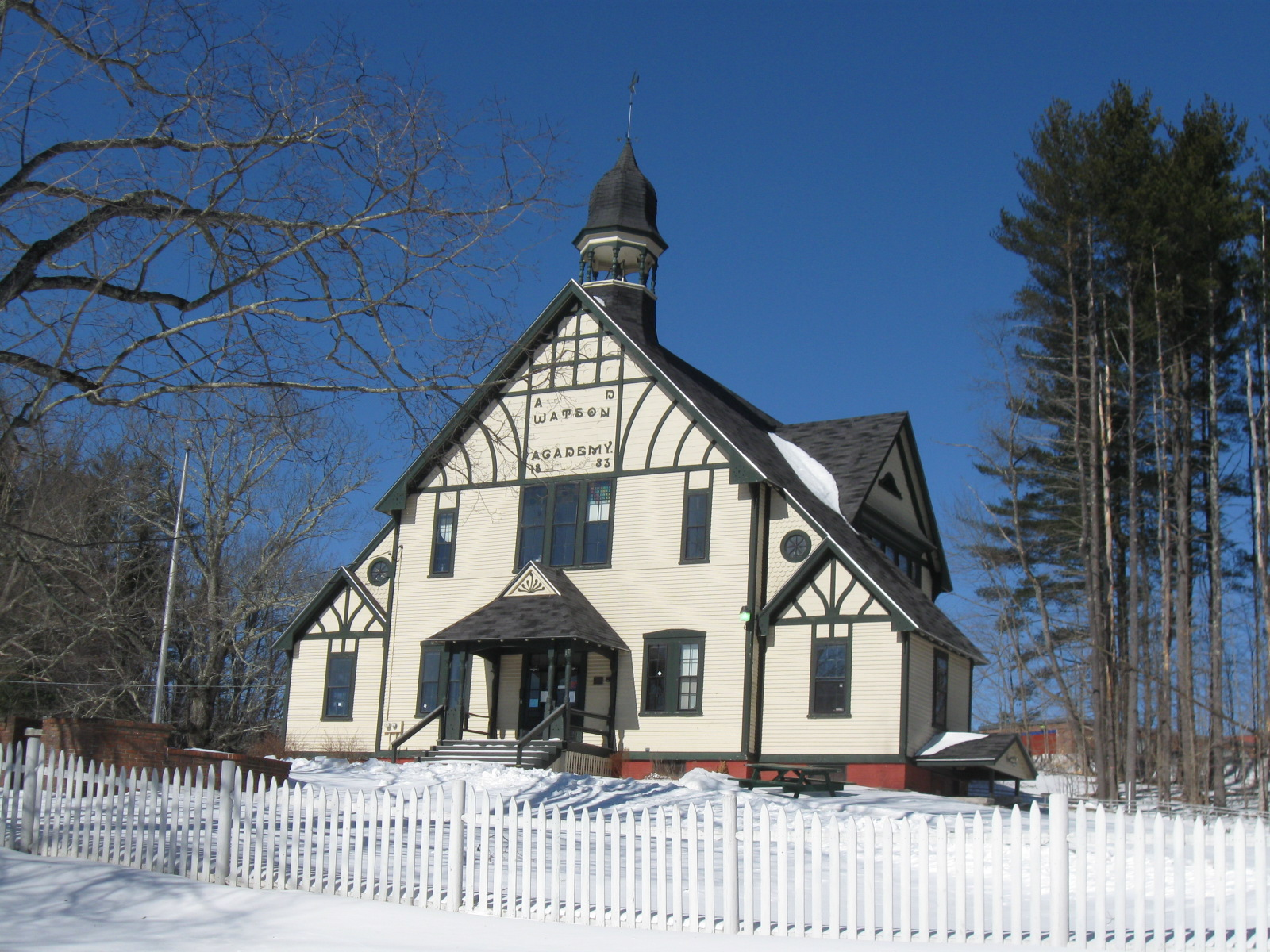

- Location within New Hampshire Location within the United States
- Location: Academy St., Epping, New Hampshire
- Coordinates: 43°2′36″N 71°4′33″W
- Area: 0.7 acres (0.28 ha)
- Built: 1883
- Architect: Charles E. Joy
- Architectural style: Queen Anne
- NRHP reference No.: 82000625
- Added to NRHP: November 9, 1982

Watson Academy is a historic school building on Academy Street in Epping, New Hampshire, United States. Built in 1883, it is the only known surviving Queen Anne style school building in southern New Hampshire. The building, which served as Epping's high school until 1966, was listed on the National Register of Historic Places in 1982.

== Description and history ==
Watson Academy is located in geographically central Epping but north of the town center, on the north side of Academy Street between Prescott Road and Main Street. The building is basically rectangular in form, with symmetrical single-story wings extending the front facade, and is finished in a combination of wooden clapboards and fish-scale shingles. It has a variety of gables and window sizes and shapes, typical of the Queen Anne period, as well as Stick style applied woodwork. It was originally adorned with decoratively corbelled brick chimneys and a conical tower; these features have been removed.

The school was built in 1883, and is the only known Queen Anne style school building in southern New Hampshire. It was designed by Dover architect Charles E. Joy, who moved to St. Paul, Minnesota, in 1884. The school was built with funds bequeathed by Daniel Watson Ladd, a local businessman, in order to provide secondary school educational opportunities to students whose families could not afford to send them to other private academies. The school was managed by private trustees for five years, and then turned over to the town. It served as Epping's high school from 1888 until 1966.

== See also ==
- National Register of Historic Places listings in Rockingham County, New Hampshire
