= Mark Wentworth House =

Historic house in New Hampshire, United States

- Gov. John Wentworth House
- U.S. National Register of Historic Places
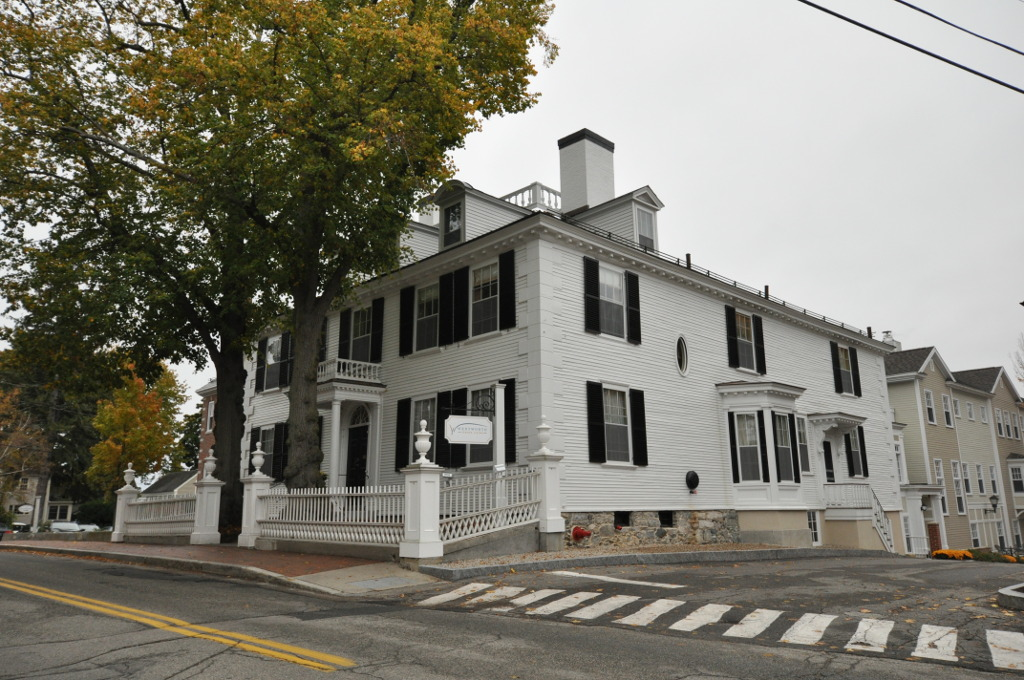
- 2016 photograph

- Location within New Hampshire Location within the United States
- Location: 346 Pleasant Street, Portsmouth, New Hampshire
- Coordinates: 43°4′25″N 70°45′14″W
- Built: 1763
- Architectural style: Georgian
- NRHP reference No.: 73000175
- Added to NRHP: June 29, 1973

The Mark Wentworth House, and also known as the Gov. John Wentworth House, is a historic house. Built in 1763, it is notable for its fine Georgian finishes, and for its associations with leading political and economic figures of 18th and 19th-century Portsmouth. The house was listed on the National Register of Historic Places in 1973. It has since the early 20th century been part of a senior care complex.

== Description and history ==
The Mark Wentworth House stands southeast of downtown Portsmouth, on the south side of Pleasant Street at Wentworth Street. The house is oriented facing north to the street, and is extended southward to the South Mill Pond by a large modern addition that houses the bulk of the senior care facilities. The house is 2 1/2 stories in height, with a hip roof and clapboarded exterior. The building corners have wooden quoins, and the cornice is lined with modillion blocks. The main facade is five bays wide, with symmetrical arrangement. The entrance at the center is topped by a half-round transom window, and is sheltered by a Federal-period portico with a modillioned cornice and hip roof surrounded by a low balustrade. The interior of the house continues the high quality wooden finishes.

The mansion was built in 1763 by Henry Appleton, a merchant, who sold it to Mark Hunking Wentworth, one of New Hampshire's wealthiest merchants and landowners, the following year. Wentworth's son John was appointed Royal Governor of New Hampshire in 1767, and occupied the house from then until his departure on the eve of the American Revolutionary War in 1775. Mark Wentworth maintained ownership of the house during the first part of this period, and transferred the property to his daughter Anna Fisher in 1770. It was sold out of the Wentworth family in 1797, and repurchased by Ebenezer Wentworth in 1810. In the early 1900s Wentworth descendants adapted the property for use as an elder care facility, a role it continues to serve today.

== See also ==
- National Register of Historic Places listings in Rockingham County, New Hampshire
