= South Meetinghouse =

- U.S. National Register of Historic Places
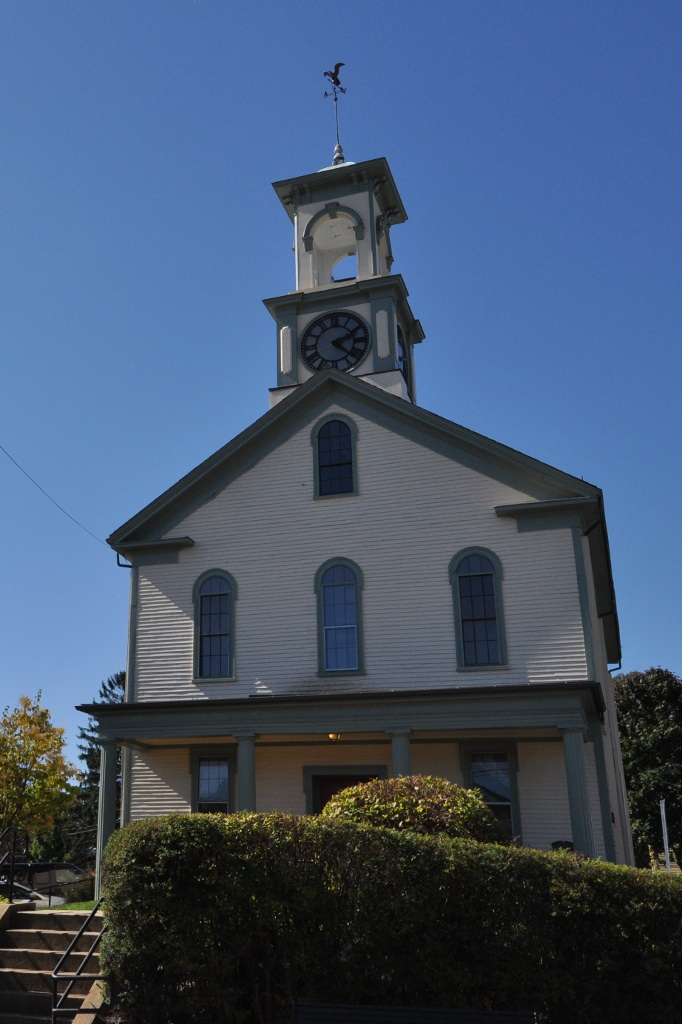

- Location within New Hampshire Location within the United States
- Location: Marcy St. and Meeting House Hill, Portsmouth, New Hampshire
- Coordinates: 43°4′29″N 70°45′10″W
- Area: 0.2 acres (0.081 ha)
- Built: 1866
- Architect: Wilson, Isaiah
- Architectural style: Greek Revival, Italianate
- NRHP reference No.: 82001695
- Added to NRHP: April 19, 1982

The South Meetinghouse is a historic ward hall at 260 Marcy Street (corner of Meeting House Hill) in Portsmouth, New Hampshire. Completed in 1866, it is one of the city's finest examples of Italianate architecture, and a rare surviving example of a 19th-century ward hall. The building was listed on the National Register of Historic Places in 1982. It continues to be used as a community resource.

== Description and history ==
The South Meetinghouse is located in Portsmouth's southern residential area, at the northwest corner of Marcy Street and Meeting House Hill. Oriented facing Marcy Street, it is a two-story wood-frame structure, with a gabled roof and clapboarded exterior. Italianate stylistic elements of the exterior include round-headed windows, and a bracketed roof at the top of its two-stage tower. The main entrance is sheltered by a Greek Revival four-column porch with Doric columns and an Ionic entablature, which extends the width of the front facade. The interior has a vestibule area with two staircases providing access to the upper level. The ground floor is divided into two spaces, with paired iron columns supporting the ceiling and upper level, which has a single large high-ceilinged chamber.

The meetinghouse was built on the site of a 1731 meeting house, and was the only major civic structure on the south side of Portsmouth. It was built in 1866, after several years of agitation by local residents for a public meeting space in the city's southernmost ward. The building was designed by a committee appointed by the city council, and was built at a cost of $9,600. The building's upper level serves as a large public meeting space, and has seen use for political meetings, ward elections, and religious services.

== See also ==
- National Register of Historic Places listings in Rockingham County, New Hampshire
