= Unitarian Church (Hampton Falls, New Hampshire) =

Historic church in New Hampshire, United States

- U.S. National Register of Historic Places
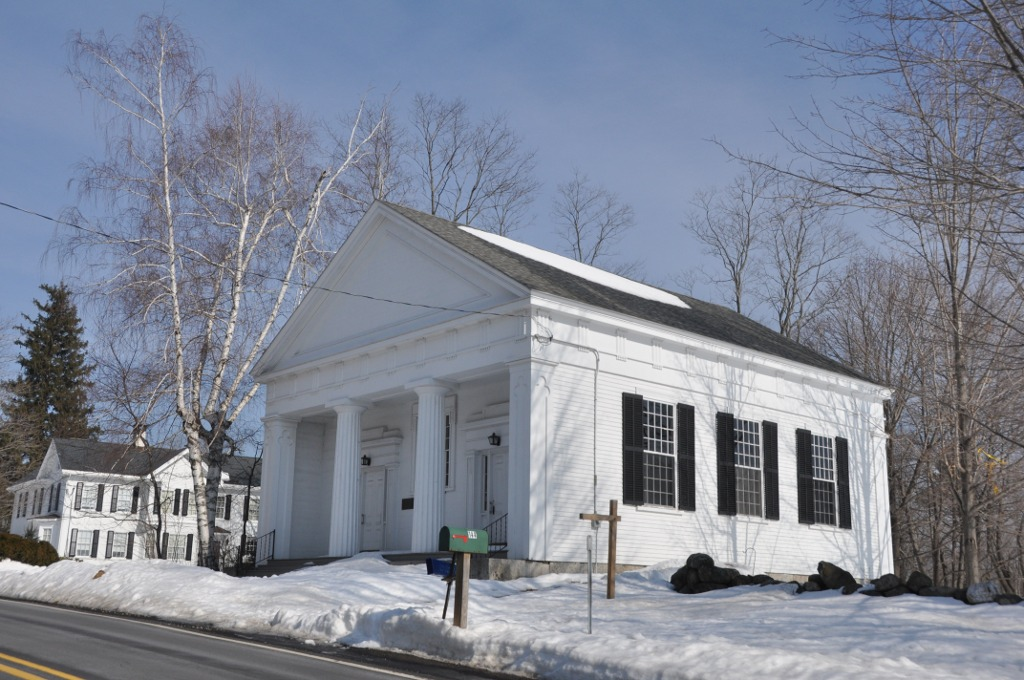

- Location within New Hampshire Location within the United States
- Location: Exeter Rd., Hampton Falls, New Hampshire
- Coordinates: 42°56′0″N 70°53′23″W
- Area: 0.1 acres (0.040 ha)
- Built: 1838
- NRHP reference No.: 84000558
- Added to NRHP: December 13, 1984

The Unitarian Church (also known as the First Congregational Society - Unitarian of Hampton Falls) is a historic American church on Exeter Road (New Hampshire Route 88) in Hampton Falls, New Hampshire. Built in 1838, it is a rare example of an in antes Greek Revival temple front in the state, and is distinguished by the presence of Victorian trompe-l'œil panels and ribbing on its interior walls. The church was listed on the National Register of Historic Places in 1984. It is presently used for services in the summertime.

== Architecture and history ==
The Hampton Falls Unitarian Church is located in a rural setting near the geographic center of the town, on the north side of Exeter Road. It is a 1 1/2-story wood-frame structure, with a gabled roof and clapboarded exterior. Its front facade is recessed behind a Greek Revival temple front whose sides are extensions of the building walls, and whose inner section is supported by two round columns. They support an entablature that encircles the building, and a gabled pediment. The wall being sheltered is finished in flushboarding, and has two symmetrically placed entrances, each flanked by pilasters and topped by an entablature. The interior is a single large chamber with a curved ceiling, upon which trompe-l'œil artwork has been painted, in part depicting architectural features such as pilasters and arches, interspersed with elements of actual three-dimensional elements. The interior is virtually unchanged from the period of construction, its principal alterations being the addition of the painting, and the removal of wood stoves and related heating pipes.

The church was built c. 1838, and has been little altered since. The only notable exterior changes are the addition of electrical lights over the entrances, and the replacement of the roof, after the original was blown off in a 1949 hurricane. The church was built near the site of Hampton Falls' 1768 Congregational meeting house, which it functionally replaced. Its surrounding area, unusual for its rural character, is also little altered. The church's in antes temple front is believed to be unique in the state, and the interior artwork is the finest to appear in regional churches of the period.

== See also ==
- National Register of Historic Places listings in Rockingham County, New Hampshire
