= Richman Margeson Estate =

Historic house in New Hampshire, United States

- Margeson, Richman, Estate
- U.S. National Register of Historic Places
- U.S. Historic district
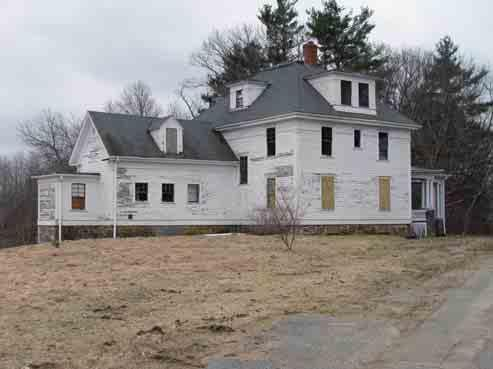
- The main estate house c. 2012

- Location within New Hampshire Location within the United States
- Location: Long Point Rd. near Great Bay shore in the Great Bay National Wildlife Refuge, Newington, New Hampshire
- Coordinates: 43°4′45″N 70°51′29″W
- Area: 11.7 acres (4.7 ha)
- Built: 1894
- Architectural style: Colonial Revival
- NRHP reference No.: 90000873
- Added to NRHP: June 21, 1990

The Richman Margeson Estate was a historic summer estate in Newington, New Hampshire. Formerly located in the Great Bay National Wildlife Refuge but not open to the public, the house was demolished in 2016. The main house, built in 1894, was a rare example of a Colonial Revival estate house in the state and was the only summer estate house of its scale to survive in Newington into the 21st century. The estate was listed on the National Register of Historic Places in 1990.

== Description and history ==
The Margeson Estate was located in a rural setting in the southwestern part of Great Bay National Wildlife Refuge, atop the rise known as Hoyt Hill, overlooking the bay and Woodman Point. The estate buildings present until 2016 included the main house and a caretaker's cottage; it also originally included a barn, carriage barn and gazebo. The main house was a two-story wood-frame structure, with a hip roof and clapboarded exterior. The building corners were pilastered, and the roof faces were pierced by hip-roof dormers. The roof was truncated, with a balustraded "widow's walk" at the center. A porte-cochère extended from one side. The caretaker's cottage stood nearby, a smaller structure dating from the 1920s. Both buildings stood vacant for more than a decade, and were reported in 2014 to suffer from mold and other damage.

The house was built in 1894 by Richman Stanley Margeson, owner of the Portsmouth Furniture Company, on what had previously been farmland. The property was purchased in 1906 by the Hawkwing family, and taken by eminent domain in 1952 by the federal government. It was for many years part of Pease Air Force Base, which used it as a social club and quarters for visiting officers. The property was kept relatively unaltered by the Air Force, and was transferred to the United States Fish and Wildlife Service c. 1992. The estate house and a caretaker's house were the estate's only surviving structures at the time; the main house was reported in 2012 to be in relatively poor condition, with mold and other moisture-related issues.

In the winter of 2016 the estate and the caretaker's house were demolished after the completion of a Memorandum of Understanding between the FWS and the New Hampshire State Historic Preservation Officer (SHPO). "Both structures were in very poor condition, with extensive water damage and pervasive mold. They also contained asbestos and lead paint. These uninhabitable structures were frequently vandalized. The estimated cost for restoring the Margeson house alone was estimated at $750,000."

== See also ==
- National Register of Historic Places listings in Rockingham County, New Hampshire
