= Cornet Thomas Wiggin House =

Historic house in New Hampshire, United States

- U.S. National Register of Historic Places
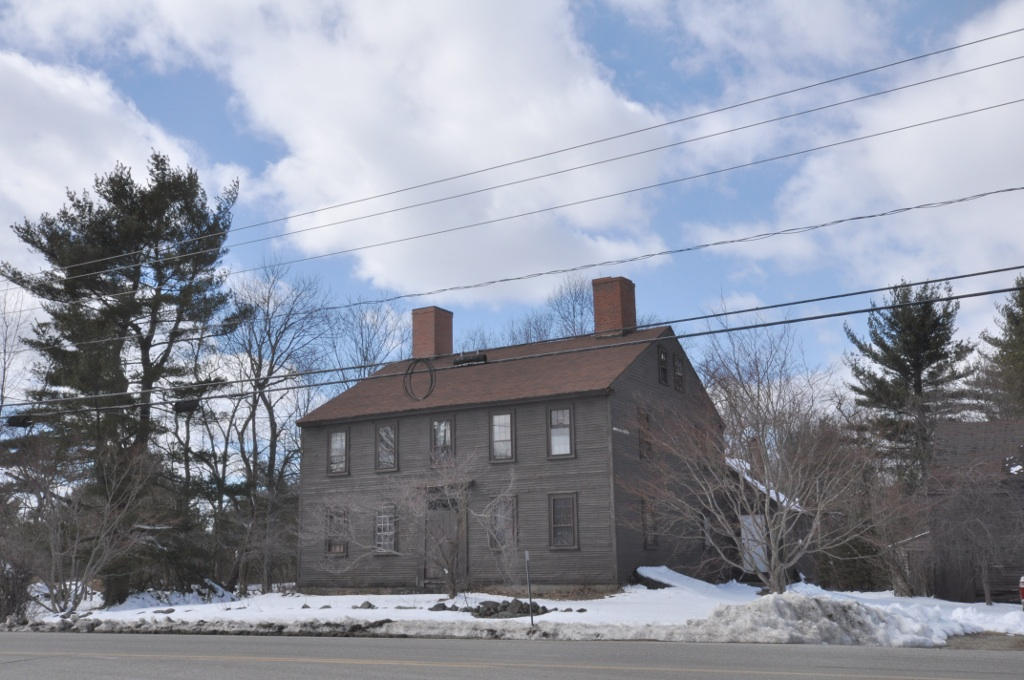

- Location within New Hampshire Location within the United States
- Location: 249 Portsmouth Ave., Stratham, New Hampshire
- Coordinates: 43°2′27″N 70°53′56″W
- Area: 5 acres (2.0 ha)
- Built: 1775
- Built by: Wiggin, Cornet Thomas; Barker, Nathan
- Architectural style: Federal
- NRHP reference No.: 83001151
- Added to NRHP: March 24, 1983

The Cornet Thomas Wiggin House is a historic house at 249 Portsmouth Avenue (New Hampshire Route 33) in Stratham, New Hampshire. Probably built in the 1770s, it is a remarkably little-altered example of vernacular Federal period architecture. It was listed on the National Register of Historic Places in 1983.

== Description and history ==
The Cornet Thomas Wiggin House is located north of the town center of Stratham, on the north side of Portsmouth Avenue at its junction with Depot Road. It is a 2 1/2-story wood-frame structure, with a side-gable roof, two interior brick chimneys, and a clapboarded exterior. The main facade is five bays wide, with a symmetrical arrangement of windows around a center entrance. The entrance includes an original wide six-panel door, flanked by tapered flat pilasters, which rise to a transom window and corniced entablature. This surround is believed to date to about 1830, when other alterations were made to the building. A two-story ell extends to the left, and a single-story ell extends to the rear, projecting slightly to the right side.

The house was built c. 1775, although it was apparently not completed until the 1790s, after the death of Thomas Wiggin and the resolution of legal disputes concerning his estate. The interior is thought to have been finished by Nathan Barker, Wiggin's son-in-law and eventual purchaser of the property. The house is a well-preserved example of vernacular Federal architecture, and the property includes a barn that is believed to date to the same period.

== See also ==
- National Register of Historic Places listings in Rockingham County, New Hampshire
