= Samuel Beck House =

Historic house in New Hampshire, United States

- U.S. National Register of Historic Places
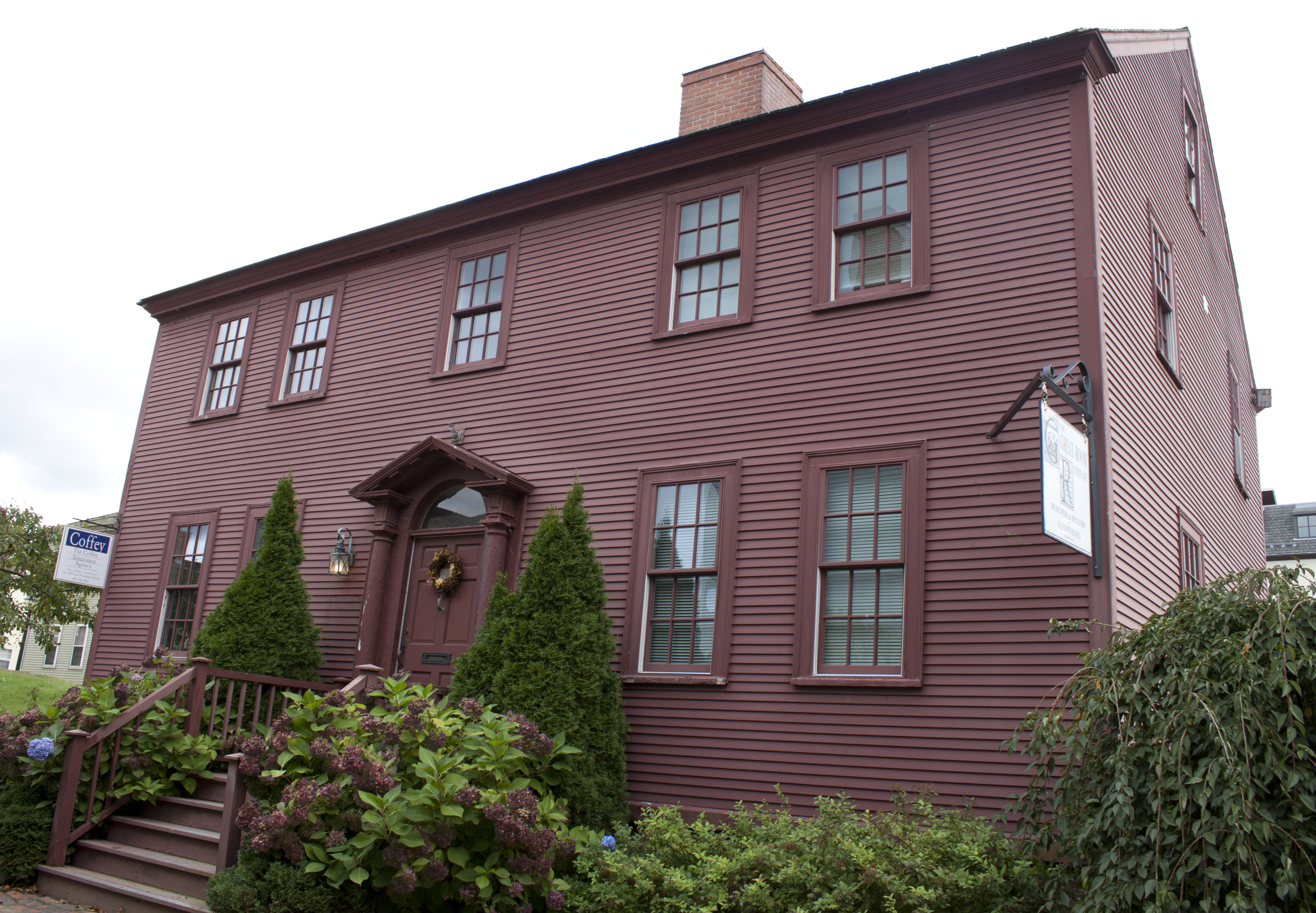

- Location within New Hampshire Location within the United States
- Location: 407 The Hill, Portsmouth, New Hampshire
- Coordinates: 43°4′42″N 70°45′36″W
- Area: less than one acre
- Architectural style: Federal, Adamesque
- NRHP reference No.: 73000167
- Added to NRHP: April 3, 1973

The Samuel Beck House is a historic house at 407 The Hill in Portsmouth, New Hampshire. Built about 1761, it is a well-preserved example of late colonial architecture with an early Federal period door surround. The building was moved to its present location as part of a project to widen nearby Deer Street. The house was listed on the National Register of Historic Places in 1973.

== Description and history ==
The Samuel Beck House stands near the southwestern corner of The Hill, a cluster of historic houses southwest of the junction of Deer and High Streets. These houses were relocated to this area as part of a road widening project. The Beck House is 2 1/2 stories in height, with a side gable roof and clapboarded exterior. It is five bays wide and two deep, with a large central chimney, and an early Federal-period front door surround with an arched fanlight. The interior retains original 18th-century features, including paneled fireplace surrounds, and a three-run winding staircase in the front entry vestibule.

The land where this house originally stood on Deer Street was platted in 1710 and subdivided in 1756. It was purchased by Samuel Beck in 1761. The neighborhood, populated in the early 20th century by Italian immigrants, was subjected to urban renewal activities in the 1960s and 1970s. This house was one of a number that was relocated to form The Hill, while others were razed or moved elsewhere.

== See also ==
- National Register of Historic Places listings in Rockingham County, New Hampshire
