= Deacon Samuel and Jabez Lane Homestead =

Historic house in New Hampshire, United States

- U.S. National Register of Historic Places
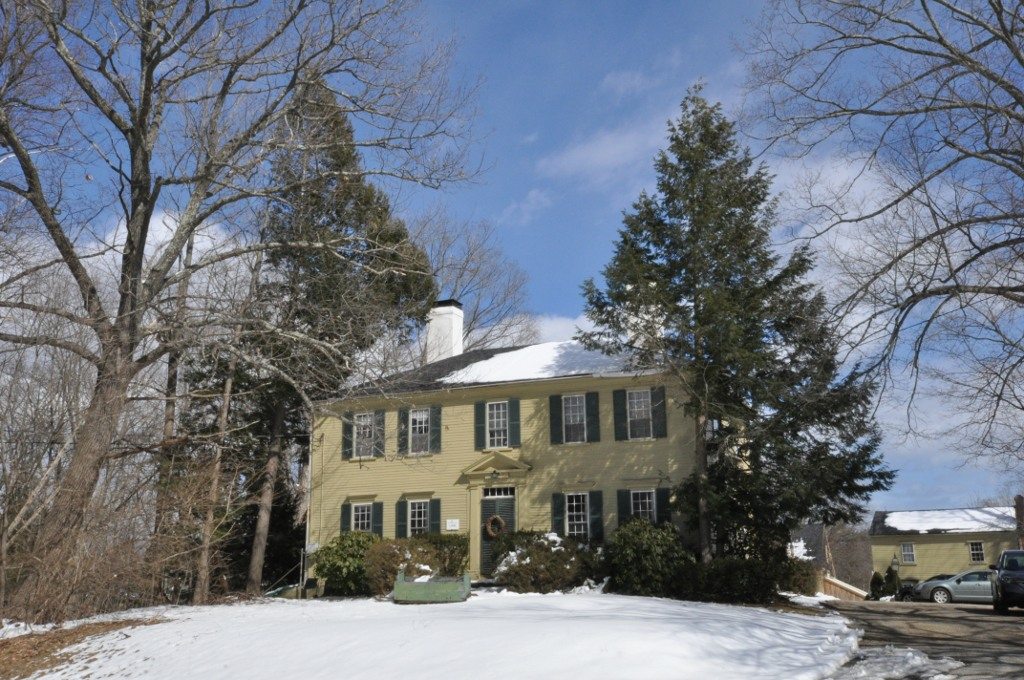

- Location within New Hampshire Location within the United States
- Location: 132 Portsmouth Ave., Stratham, New Hampshire
- Coordinates: 43°1′22″N 70°55′0″W
- Area: 5 acres (2.0 ha)
- Built: 1740
- Architect: Lane, Deacon Samuel; Lane, Jabez
- Architectural style: Federal
- NRHP reference No.: 83001148
- Added to NRHP: April 8, 1983

The Deacon Samuel and Jabez Lane Homestead is a historic farmstead at 132 Portsmouth Avenue in Stratham, New Hampshire. Built in 1807, the main house is a fine local example of Federal period architecture, with carvings executed by a regional master craftsman. The property is further significant because the owners at the time of its construction kept detailed journals documenting the construction of it and other buildings on the property. The property was listed on the National Register of Historic Places in 1983.

== Description and history ==
The Deacon Samuel and Jabez Lane Homestead occupies a roughly triangular island of land bounded by the junction of New Hampshire Routes 33 and 108, which functions as a rotary. The property includes four buildings: the main house, a shoe shop, corn house, and barn. The main house is on the west side of the island; it is a 2 1/2-story wood-frame structure, with a hip roof and end chimneys. Its main facade is five bays wide and symmetrical, with a center entrance framed by Federal period pilasters, a four-light transom window, and a fully pedimented gable. The house interior has received only modest alteration since its construction in 1807, retaining stencilwork on the parlor floor and a fine cherry central staircase. A modernized ell extends to the rear (east).

The four buildings that stand here were part of a once-larger industrial site, which also included a tanning yard, workhouses, and worker residences. Samuel Lane acquired this property in 1741, and his house was largely completed the following year. The shoe shop and a barn followed, and Lane operated a successful tannery on the premises until his death in 1806. It was taken over by his son Jabez, who expanded the premises. He built a new house on the site of his father's old house, a process that took two years. The corn house, now converted to residential use, dates to this period, and its construction and that of the house are detailed in Jabez Lane's journals. The extant barn, now housing a commercial establishment, appears to date to the mid-19th century. The house is notable for the joinery (particularly of its main staircase) of local craftsman Ebenezer Clifford. Most of its 20th-century modifications, including the addition of minimal modern services to the main block and the addition of porches, have been made to be easily reversible.

== See also ==
- National Register of Historic Places listings in Rockingham County, New Hampshire
