= James Neal House =

Historic house in New Hampshire, United States

- U.S. National Register of Historic Places
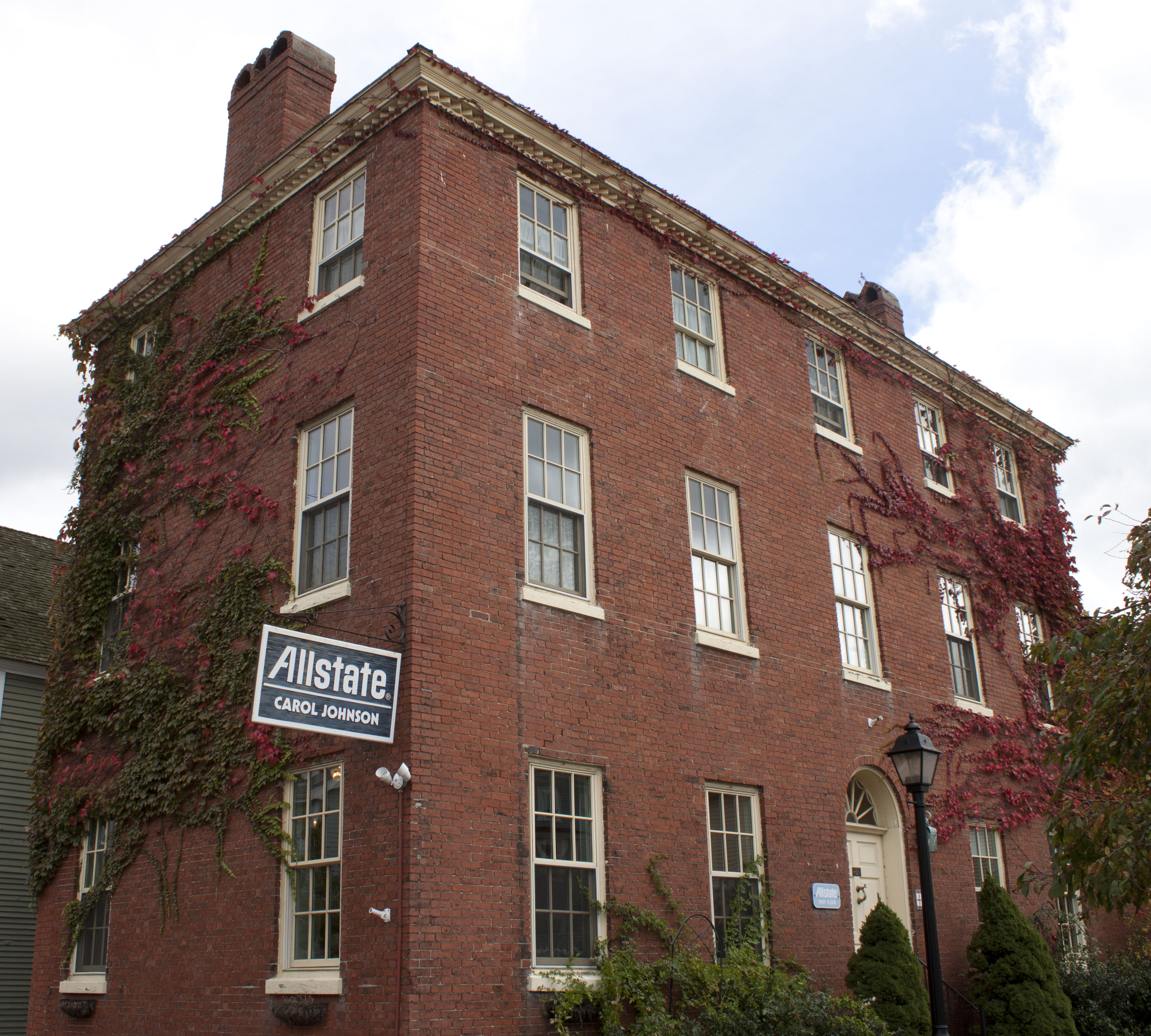

- Location within New Hampshire Location within the United States
- Location: 74 Deer St., Portsmouth, New Hampshire
- Coordinates: 43°4′44″N 70°45′41″W
- Area: less than one acre
- Built: 1832
- Architectural style: Federal
- NRHP reference No.: 72000112
- Added to NRHP: August 7, 1972

The James Neal House is a historic house at 74 Deer Street in Portsmouth, New Hampshire. Built about 1830, it is distinctive as the only brick house to be built in the Deer Street area, and one of the last Federal style houses to be built in the city. It was listed on the National Register of Historic Places in 1972.

== Description and history ==
The James Neal House stands in "The Hill", a cluster of closely-spaced historic houses bounded on the north by Deer Street and the east by High Street at the northern edge of downtown Portsmouth. This grouping was created by a road widening project from houses originally located on or near Deer Street. This house is a three-story brick structure, oriented facing west on the south side of Deer Street. The side facing the street is two bays wide, while the main facade is five bays wide, with a center entrance topped by a Federal style fanlight. The interior is finished in largely original transitional Federal-Greek Revival styling. It has a modestly Federal central stairway, and original fireplace surrounds.

The house was built about 1830–32 by James Neal, a local merchant. It is one of the last known examples of the Federal style built in the city. It is also unusual for its sophistication in what was then a residential area away from most of the city's merchant houses.

== See also ==
- National Register of Historic Places listings in Rockingham County, New Hampshire
