= Capt. Jonathan Currier House =

Historic house in New Hampshire, United States

- U.S. National Register of Historic Places
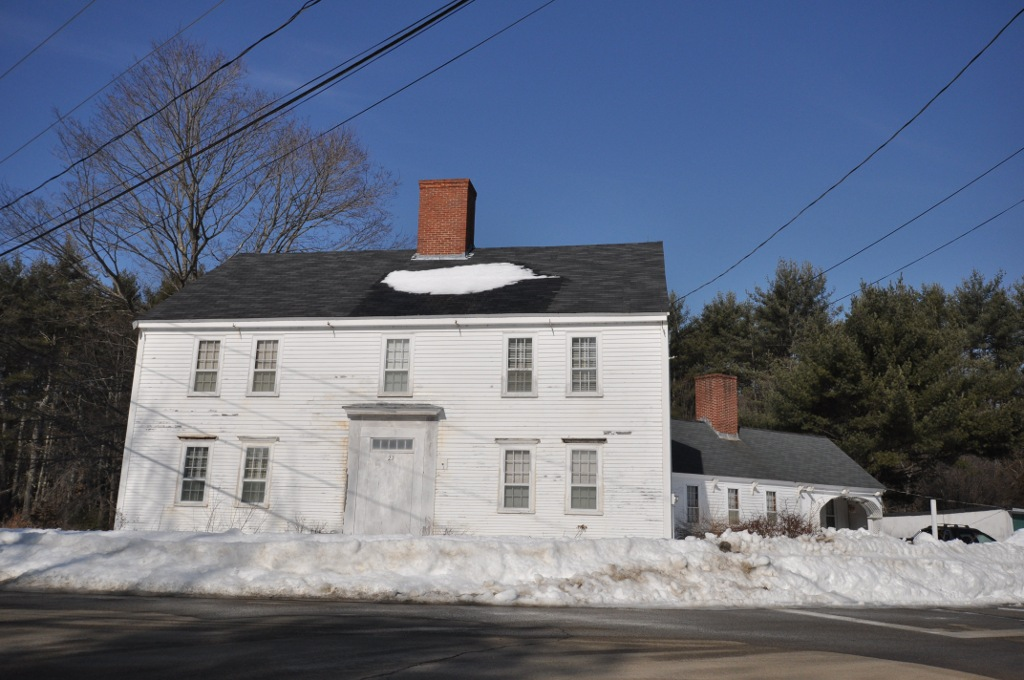

- Location within New Hampshire Location within the United States
- Location: Hilldale Ave., South Hampton, New Hampshire
- Coordinates: 42°52′34″N 71°0′8″W
- Area: 6 acres (2.4 ha)
- Built: 1742
- Built by: Currier, Capt. Jonathan
- Architectural style: Georgian
- MPS: South Hampton MRA
- NRHP reference No.: 83001145
- Added to NRHP: April 11, 1983

The Captain Jonathan Currier House is a historic house on Hillside Avenue in South Hampton, New Hampshire. Built about 1742, it is the oldest surviving house in Currierville, one of the early settlement areas in South Hampton. It was listed on the National Register of Historic Places in 1983.

== Description and history ==
The Captain Jonathan Currier House stands at the three-way intersection of Hilldale Avenue with Currier Street and Lone Goose Road. It is set facing south toward the intersection and close to the road. It is a 2 1/2-story wood-frame structure, with a side-gable roof, central brick chimney, and clapboarded exterior. Its main facade is five bays wide, with a central entrance flanked by simple pilasters and topped by a transom window and cornice. A single-story ell extends at an angle from the rear of the house, parallel to Hillside Avenue.

The house, a typical vernacular Georgian style construnction, was built c. 1742 by Jonathan Currier, whose family was among the early settlers of the western part of South Hampton, and for whom the area is named Currierville. It is the oldest house standing in the area, a significant agricultural settlement in the 18th and 19th centuries. Because of its proximity to nearby Newton, the area's residents, including Currier and others in his family, twice petitioned the state (without success) to become part of Newton.

== See also ==
- National Register of Historic Places listings in Rockingham County, New Hampshire
