= Town Center Historic District =

Historic district in New Hampshire, United States

- U.S. National Register of Historic Places
- U.S. Historic district
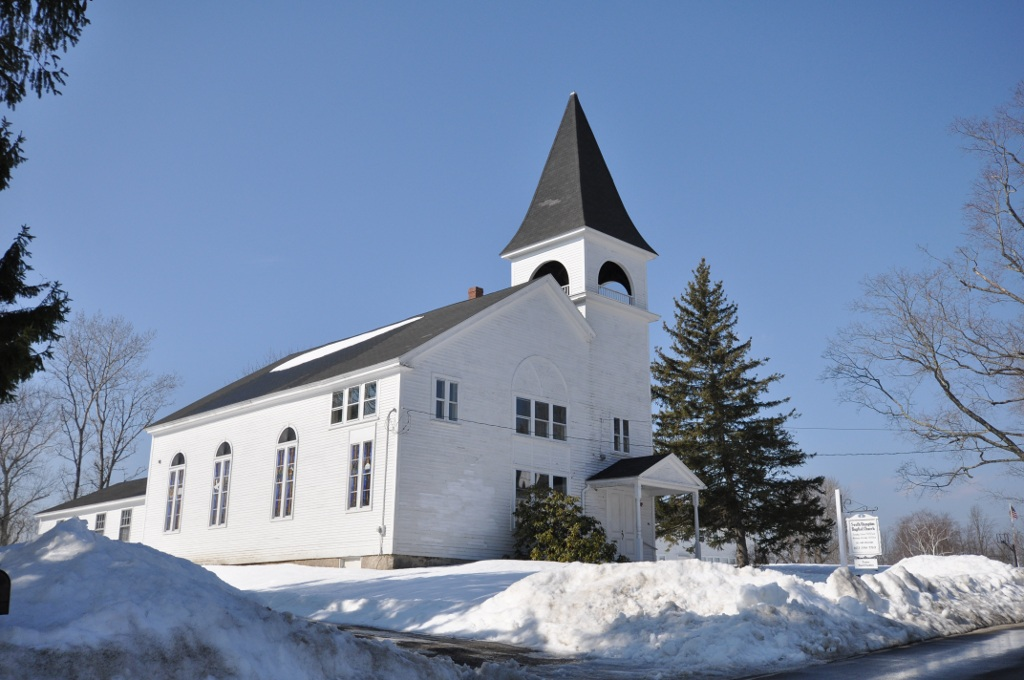
- The Baptist church

- Location within New Hampshire Location within the United States
- Location: Main and Hilldale Aves. and Jewell St., South Hampton, New Hampshire
- Coordinates: 42°52′52″N 70°57′47″W
- Area: 418.2 acres (169.2 ha)
- Architect: Multiple
- Architectural style: Mixed (more Than 2 Styles From Different Periods)
- MPS: South Hampton MRA
- NRHP reference No.: 83001150
- Added to NRHP: April 11, 1983

The Town Center Historic District encompasses the historic village center of South Hampton, New Hampshire. Centered around the Barnard Green, the town common, on New Hampshire Route 107A, it includes architectural reminders of the town's growth and change over time. The district was listed on the National Register of Historic Places in 1983.

== Description and history ==
South Hampton's town common, Barnard Green, is located near the geographic center of the town. It is a long rectangular open area on the southwest side of New Hampshire Route 107A (Main Avenue), a historic main road between Kingston, New Hampshire, and Newburyport, Massachusetts. The historic district extends along Main Avenue south to the Massachusetts state line and north to the Nettle Hiller House, and westerly along Hilldale Avenue. It includes a cluster of civic buildings that are predominantly Greek Revival in character, including the town hall, Baptist church, and Barnard School, all of which were built during the 1830s. The residential character of the area is significantly early 20th-century in character, due to a 1912 fire that destroyed a number of houses facing the common, but there are a number of 18th and early 19th-century houses.

The district is anchored at the southern end by the Kiely House, a Georgian brick house that stands on Main Avenue just north of the Massachusetts line. Not far to its north is the c. 1720 Ordway House, the only surviving Georgian saltbox in the town. Before reaching the green, the road passes a c. 1820 Federal house that once functioned as a tavern serving stagecoach customers. The civic buildings are clustered around the eastern end of the common; the c. 1832 Greek Revival Baptist church is oriented facing east toward Jewell Street. Directly north of this area is the "Hilltop Fire" area, in which nine older structures were demolished in 1912; this area is now populated by Colonial Revival and other 20th-century houses that are similar in scale to other residential architecture in the district.

== See also ==
- National Register of Historic Places listings in Rockingham County, New Hampshire
