= Nutter-Rymes House =

Historic house in New Hampshire, United States

- U.S. National Register of Historic Places
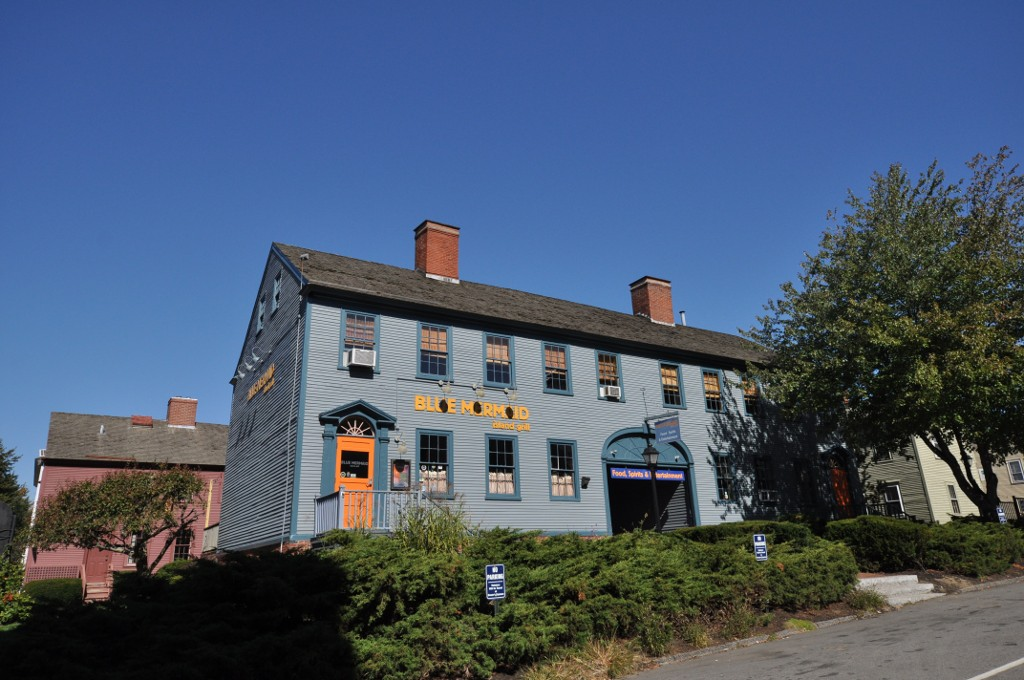

- Location within New Hampshire Location within the United States
- Location: 409 The Hill, Portsmouth, New Hampshire
- Coordinates: 43°4′42″N 70°45′36″W
- Area: less than one acre
- Built: 1809
- Built by: Nutter, James
- Architectural style: Federal, Adamesque
- NRHP reference No.: 72000085
- Added to NRHP: November 3, 1972

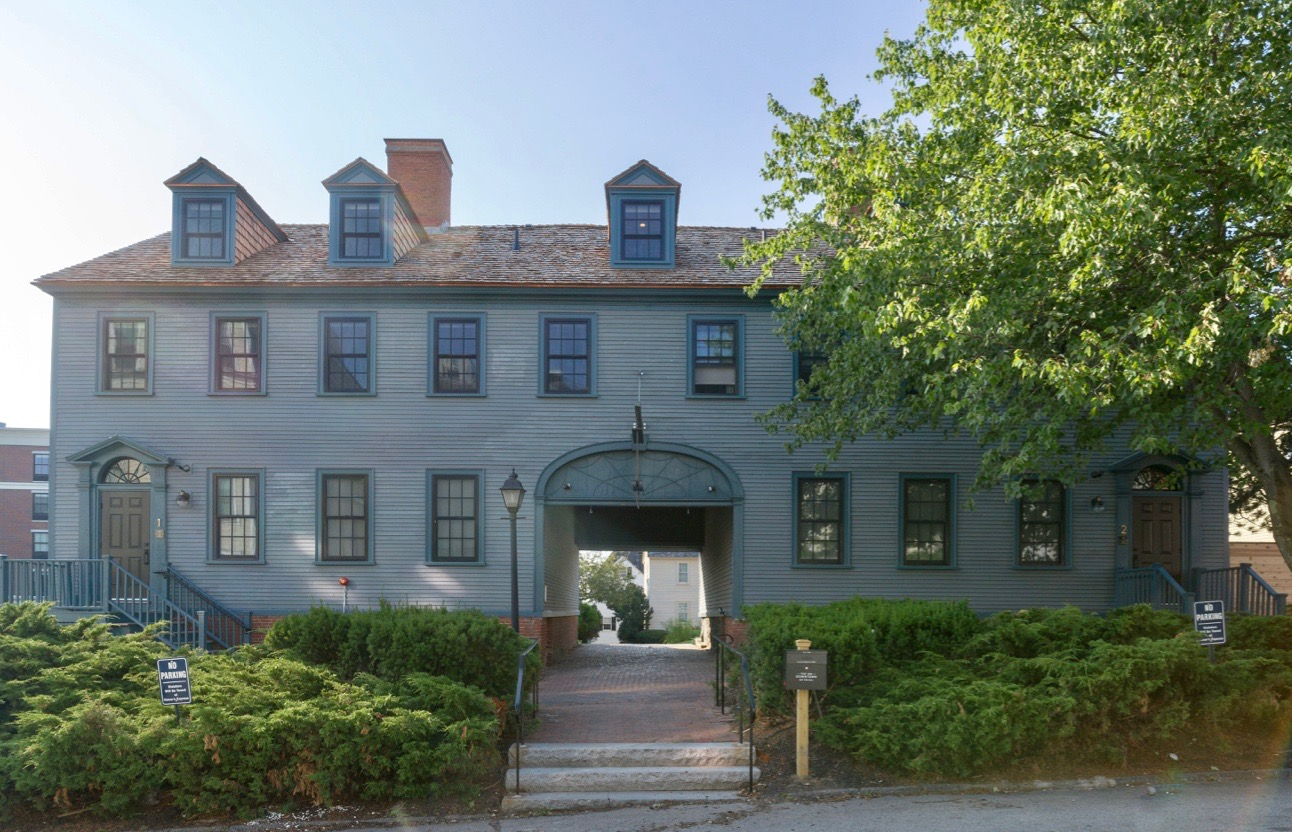
The Inn Downtown

The Nutter-Rymes House is a historic house at 409 The Hill in Portsmouth, New Hampshire. Built in 1809, it is an unusual double house with an arched carriageway in the middle, and an important surviving early example of urban residential design in the city. The house was listed on the National Register of Historic Places in 1972. Currently it is occupied by the apart-hotel THE INN Downtown.

== Description and history ==
The Nutter-Rymes House stands in The Hill, a cluster of closely spaced historic houses bounded on the north by Deer Street and the east by High Street at the northern edge of downtown Portsmouth. This grouping was created by a road widening project from houses originally located on or near Deer Street. This house, located at the southeastern corner of The Hill, is one of the few in the group that remains at its original location. It is a 2 1/2-story wood-frame structure, with a side-gable roof and clapboarded exterior. Its most distinctive feature is the large central keystoned arch, which originally provided a vehicular passage between the two halves of the building. The building entrances are located at the outermost bays of the long southern facade.

The two houses were built by James Nutter for himself and Christopher Rymes, a merchant and real estate speculator, and were originally mirror-image duplicates. The house is important because Nutter was a major local builder at the time, and the house serves as a window into his building practices. It is also an early surviving example in the city of a house that was specifically designed for an urban setting, rather than being an adaptation of an older rural form.

== See also ==
- National Register of Historic Places listings in Rockingham County, New Hampshire
