= Plaistow Carhouse =

- U.S. National Register of Historic Places
- Location within New Hampshire Location within the United States
- Location: 27 Elm St., Plaistow, New Hampshire
- Coordinates: 42°50′21″N 71°5′33″W
- Area: 5.7 acres (2.3 ha)
- Built: 1901
- Architect: Shaeff & Jaastad
- NRHP reference No.: 80000303
- Added to NRHP: December 10, 1980

The Plaistow Carhouse was a historic streetcar carhouse at 27 Elm Street in Plaistow, New Hampshire. Built in 1901, it was a surviving reminder of a short-lived trolley service that served the town until 1930. It was listed on the National Register of Historic Places in 1980 and was demolished around 1985.

== Description and history ==
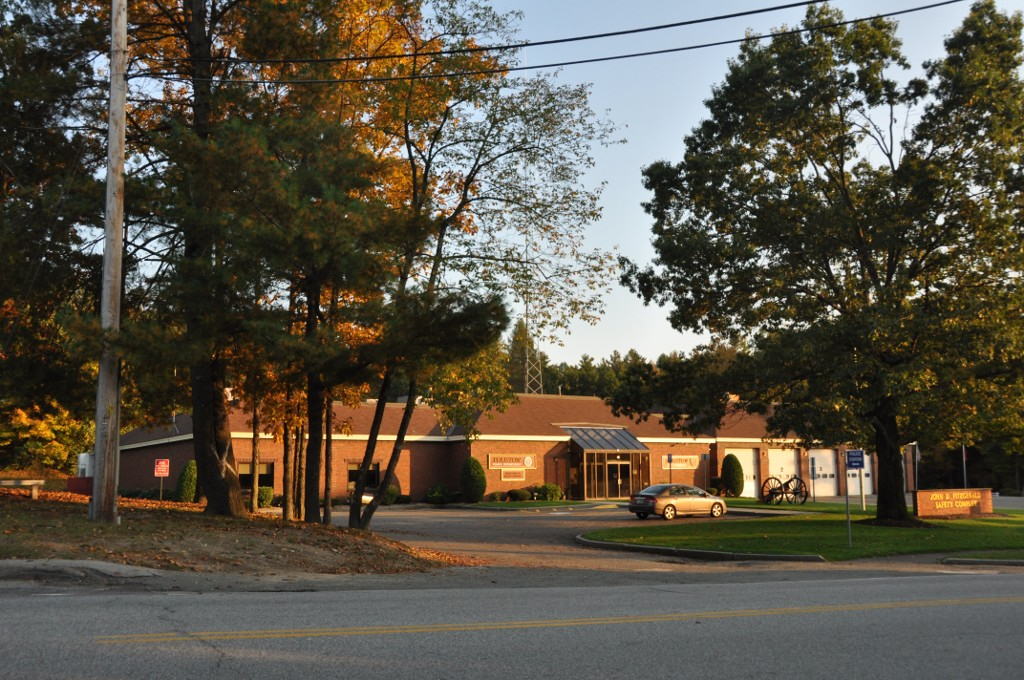
The public safety complex that now occupies the site

The Plaistow Carhouse was located in Plaistow's central village, at the southeast corner of Elm Street and Palmer Avenue. It was a brick structure, consisting of a large structure in which trolleys were serviced, and a smaller area originally used as an office and waiting room. The service area measured 50 by 150 feet (15 m × 46 m), and was covered by a flat roof with a monitor section at the center. The office was two stories in height, also with a flat roof, and was five bays wide and two deep.

The carhouse was built in 1901 for the Haverhill, Plaistow & Newton Street Railway, which introduced service that year between Plaistow, Haverhill, and Amesbury, Massachusetts. This company was eventually consolidated into one providing service as far as New Hampshire's seacoast. The company provided year-round service to the industrial employment centers of Haverhill and Amesbury, with seacoast service running mainly in the warmer months. It became part of the Massachusetts Northeastern Street Railway in 1913. Coastal service was abandoned in 1920, and altogether by 1930. The Plaistow carhouse was one of several to survive in southern New Hampshire, and was one of the least-altered. It was designed by the New York City firm Sheaff & Jaastad.

After trolley service was discontinued, the building was used as a storage facility by an amusement company. It was purchased by the town in 1979 with the intention of conversion into a public safety complex. The former carhouse was demolished around 1985, however, in favor of a new structure.

== See also ==
- National Register of Historic Places listings in Rockingham County, New Hampshire
