= Bartlett-Cushman House =

Historic house in New Hampshire, United States

- U.S. National Register of Historic Places
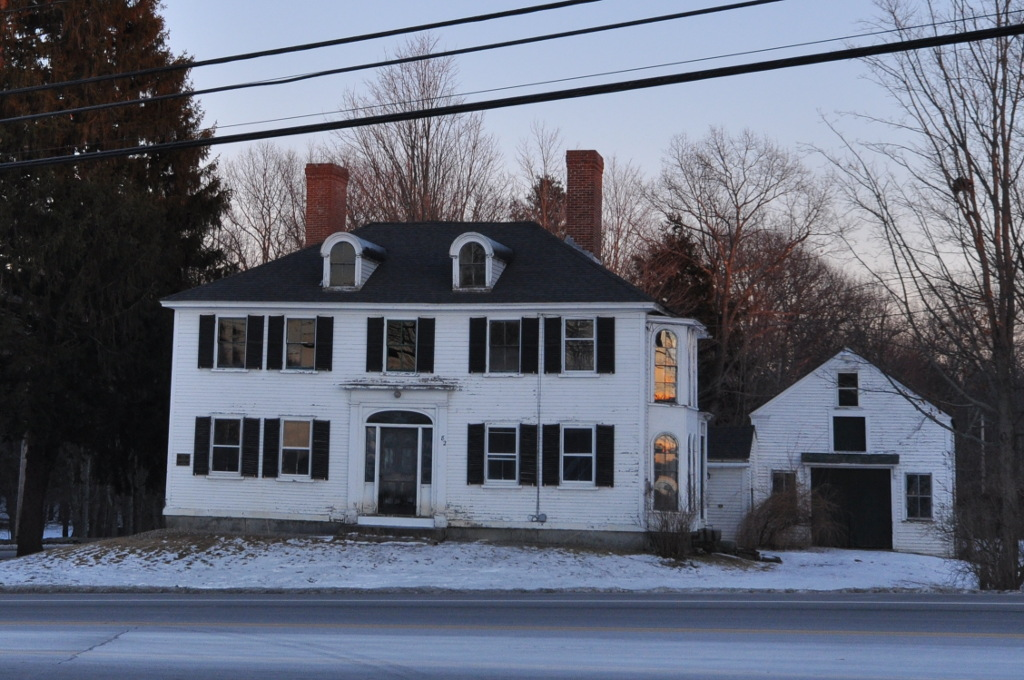

- Location within New Hampshire Location within the United States
- Location: 82 Portsmouth Ave., Stratham, New Hampshire
- Coordinates: 43°0′44″N 70°55′2″W
- Area: 2.25 acres (0.91 ha)
- Built: 1827
- Architectural style: Federal
- NRHP reference No.: 14000844
- Added to NRHP: October 8, 2014

The Bartlett-Cushman House is a historic house at 82 Portsmouth Road (New Hampshire Route 33) in Stratham, New Hampshire. Built about 1810, it is one of the town's best examples of Federal-style architecture. It was listed on the National Register of Historic Places in 2014.

== Description and history ==
The Bartlett-Cushman House is located in the town center of Stratham, at the southeast corner of Bunker Hill Road and Portsmouth Road (New Hampshire Route 108). It is a 2 1/2-story wood-frame structure, with a clapboarded exterior. It is five bays wide and three deep. It is an example of a Federal-style double house, with its principal entrance framed by sidelight windows and pilasters, with a fanlight window and entablature above. Secondary entrances are simpler, with four-light transom windows topped by a bracketed cornice. The southern half of the house has a projecting two-story bay, probably added in the mid-19th century, with narrow round-arch windows. It has a hip roof, with a pair of rounded dormers on the front elevation. A 19th-century addition connects the main block to a stable.

The house was built in 1827 for Josiah Bartlett III, who had recently established a medical practice in Stratham and married that year. The house was built by Joshua Pike, a local builder. Its foundation exhibits one of the earliest known uses in the state of plug drills and feathers to split the granite slabs it is made of, and its Federal-style decorations are among the finest in the town. Bartlett descendants remained in the house until 1904; after passing through a series of short-term owners, it was acquired by Susie and Arthur Cushman. The Cushmans converted the house into a duplex, each half occupied by part of their extended family. After the last of the Cushman residents died in 2003, their heirs auctioned off the house contents, and sold the house to the town in 2013.

== See also ==
- National Register of Historic Places listings in Rockingham County, New Hampshire
