= Jewell Town District =

Historic district in New Hampshire, United States

- U.S. National Register of Historic Places
- U.S. Historic district
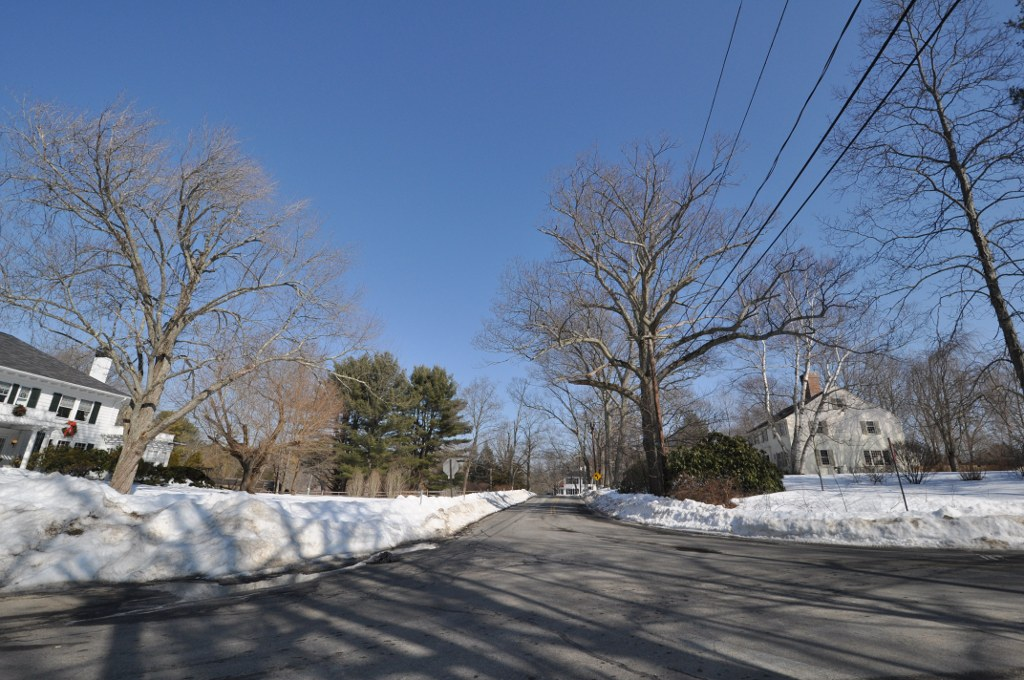

- Location within New Hampshire Location within the United States
- Location: W. Whitehall Rd. and Jewell St., South Hampton, New Hampshire
- Coordinates: 42°52′22″N 70°58′8″W
- Area: 78.9 acres (31.9 ha)
- Built: 1687
- Built by: Multiple
- Architectural style: Mixed (more Than 2 Styles From Different Periods)
- MPS: South Hampton MRA
- NRHP reference No.: 83001147
- Added to NRHP: April 11, 1983

The Jewell Town District of South Hampton, New Hampshire, encompasses a colonial-era industrial village with a history dating to 1687. It is centered at the junction of West Whitehall and Jewell Streets, which is just south of a bend in the Powwow River, the source of the power for the mills that were built here. The area was settled in 1687 by Thomas Jewell, and by the early 19th century included a variety of mills as well as a bog iron works. The district now includes only remnants of its industrial past, and features a collection of 18th and early-19th century residential architecture. The district was listed on the National Register of Historic Places in 1983.

== Description and history ==
Jewell Town is located in central southern South Hampton, hugging the state line with Massachusetts. It is now a largely rural residential area, with farmland and former farmland and woodlands predominating the landscape. The historic district is about 79 acres (32 ha) in size, and extends along West Whitehall Road from crossing point of the state line in the west, to a triangular junction with Jewell Street and Whitehall Road in the east. This junction is between two bridges across the Powwow River, and is the most densely built part of the district. West Whitehall Road is sparsely lined with houses ranging in age from about 1740 to the 20th century. All are wood frame structure, 1-1/2 to 2-1/2 stories in height, and the majority were built before about 1850 in Colonial, Federal and Greek Revival styles. Later constructions are in more vernacular forms, although there is one early 20th-century Colonial Revival house.

The area was first settled in 1687 by Thomas Jewell. The waters of the Powwow River were recognized from an early date as a useful source of power, and the bend on the Powwow River was the site of most of South Hampton's 18th-century industry. Industries in the area included several sawmills, a gristmill, fulling mill, and an iron works. In the 19th century more specialized businesses arose, included manufacturers of pails, matches, and axles. Water-based industry was effectively killed when the Salisbury Mill Company, located just to the south in Amesbury, Massachusetts, bought up all of the water rights and reserved them for its own use.

== See also ==
- National Register of Historic Places listings in Rockingham County, New Hampshire
