= New Hampshire Bank Building =

- U.S. National Register of Historic Places
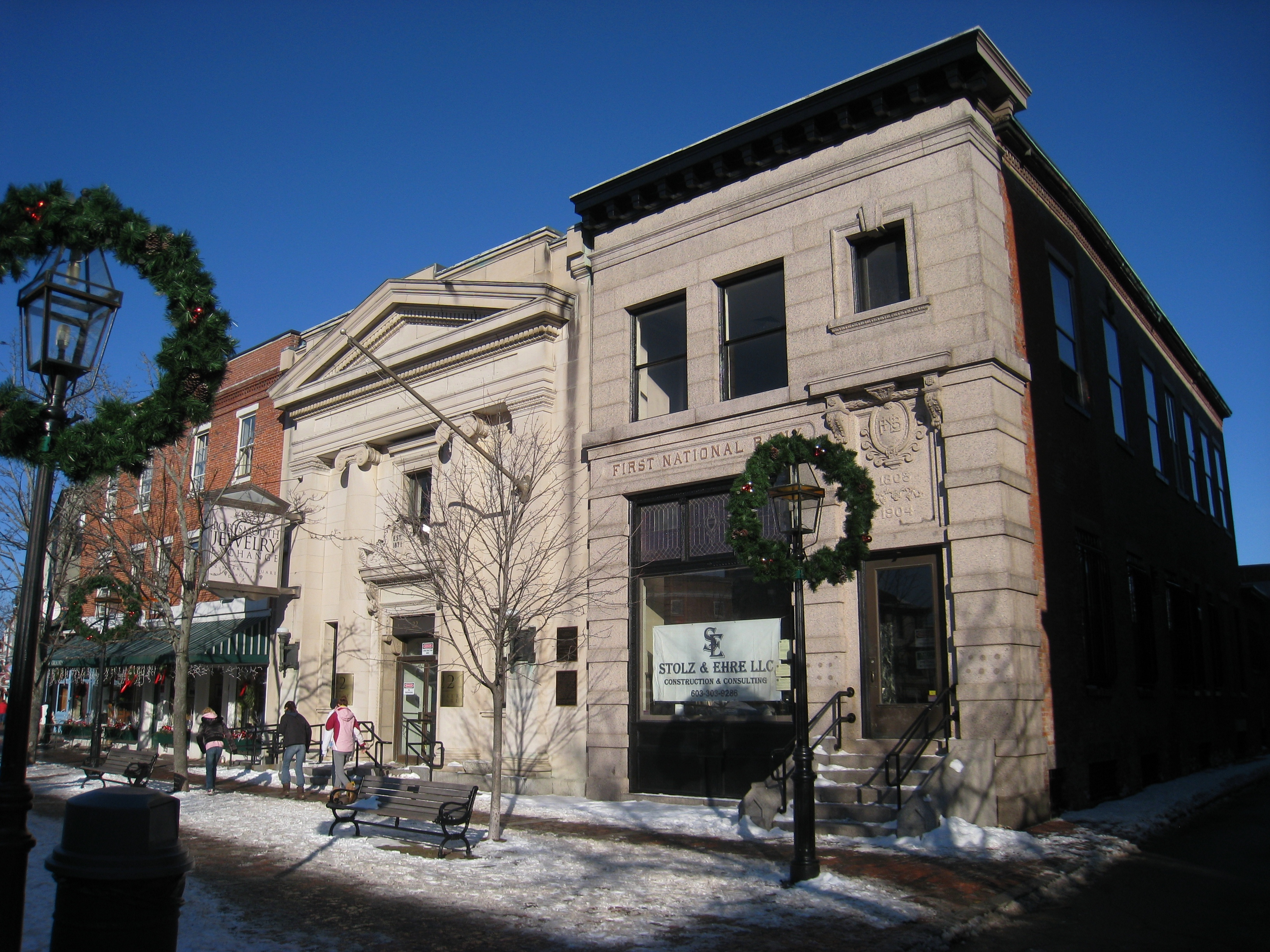

- Location within New Hampshire Location within the United States
- Location: 22-26 Market Sq., Portsmouth, New Hampshire
- Coordinates: 43°4′36.6″N 70°45′26″W
- Area: 0.1 acres (0.040 ha)
- Built: 1803
- Architect: Eliphalet Ladd
- Architectural style: Classical Revival, Beaux Arts
- NRHP reference No.: 79000207
- Added to NRHP: September 10, 1979

The New Hampshire Bank Building is a historic commercial building at 22-26 Market Square, Portsmouth, New Hampshire. Built in 1803 and much altered since, it is one of the nation's oldest purpose-built bank buildings, and was until 1977 the oldest building used continuously to house banking operations. It was added to the National Register of Historic Places in 1979.

== Description and history ==
The New Hampshire Bank Building is prominently sited in downtown Portsmouth's Market Square, on the east side of the square, one building south of Daniel Street. Due to its extensive history of alteration, the building now has two different facades, one next to the other. When built, it was a two-story brick structure, with a five-bay front facade, of which the center three bays were recessed. The recessed area was covered by a roof, which sheltered entrances into the projecting outer bays. In 1869 the building was partitioned into two ground-floor spaces, with front-facing entrances to those, and a third center entrance providing access to the upper floor. In 1903 the building was widened, and the left side restyled in the Classical Revival. The right side was renovated in 1904, giving that half a granite Beaux Arts facade. In the 30-foot (9.1 m) lobby hangs a giant stained glass dome depicting the New Hampshire State Seal.

The building was erected in 1803 for the New Hampshire Bank after a house which was serving as its office burned in the great fire of 1802. New Hampshire Bank, chartered in 1792, was the first bank in the state. The building's ground floor spaces were occupied by a succession of banking interests, including two different banks beginning with the 1869 partition. Among those occupying offices on the second floor were New Hampshire Governor Levi Woodbury, his pupil, later President, Franklin Pierce, and New Hampshire Attorney General Jeremiah Mason. All three were U.S. senators from New Hampshire for one or more terms.

The building was occupied by banks until 1977, when it was sold to a real estate agent, who adapted one side for his agency, and leased the other to a mortgage broker. The building now houses non-banking commercial businesses.

== See also ==
- National Register of Historic Places listings in Rockingham County, New Hampshire
