= Larkin-Rice House =

Historic house in New Hampshire, United States

- U.S. National Register of Historic Places
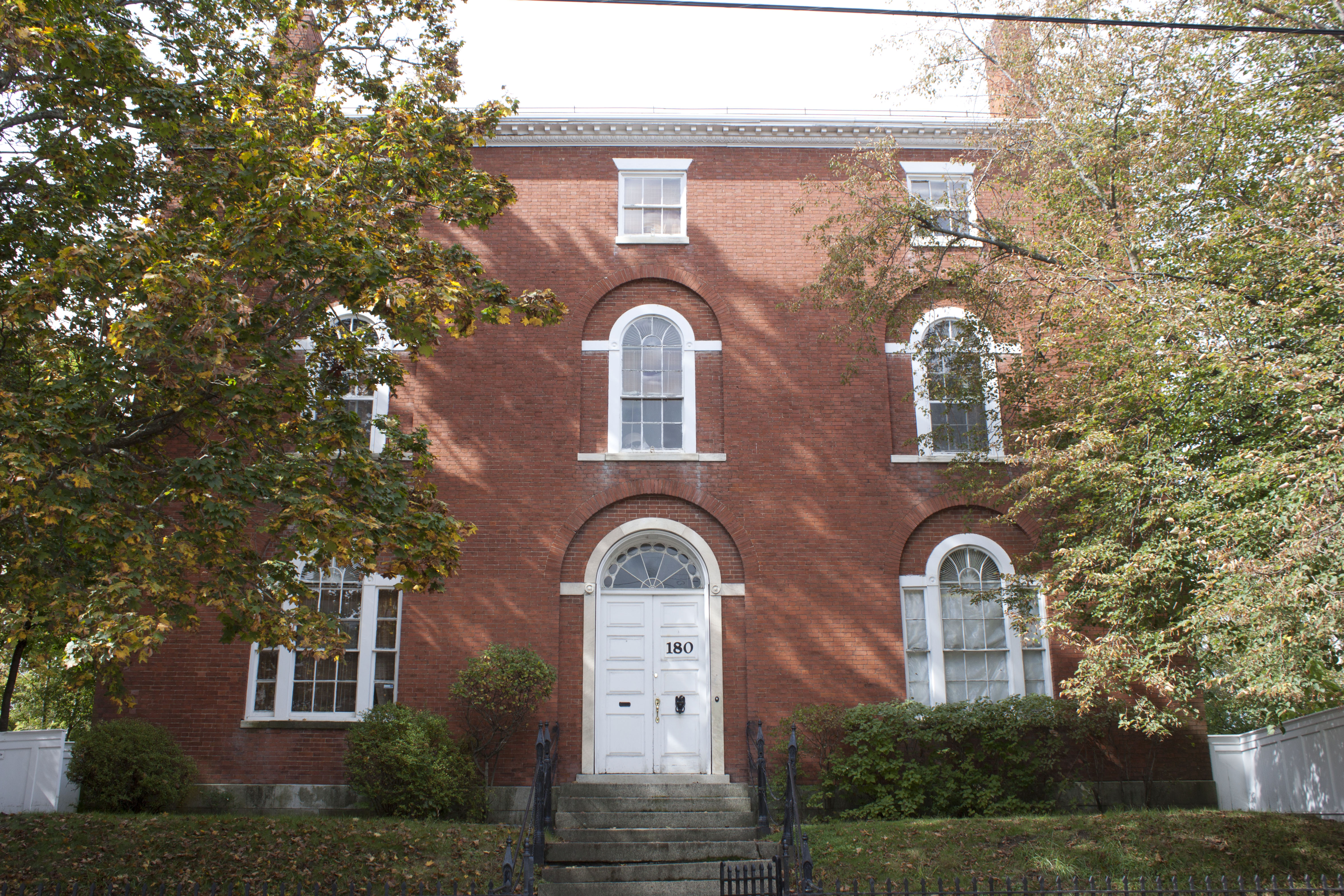

- Location within New Hampshire Location within the United States
- Location: 180 Middle St., Portsmouth, New Hampshire
- Coordinates: 43°4′24″N 70°45′43″W
- Area: 0.7 acres (0.28 ha)
- Built: 1813
- NRHP reference No.: 79000205
- Added to NRHP: November 29, 1979

The Larkin-Rice House is a historic house at 180 Middle Street in Portsmouth, New Hampshire. Built c. 1813–15, it is a distinctive example of Federal period architecture, notable for its facade, which has five Palladian windows. It was listed on the National Register of Historic Places in 1979.

== Description and history ==
The Larkin-Rice House stands on the west side of Middle Street, a busy through street south of downtown Portsmouth, between Austin and State Streets. It is a three-story brick building, roughly square in footprint, with four chimneys and a truncated hip roof with a widow's walk at its center. The main facade is three bays wide, with a symmetrical arrangement of windows around a centered entrances. The windows flanking the entrance are classical three-part Palladian windows, with narrow sidelights and a rounded center window. On the second floor are three similar arrangements, except the flanking sidelights have been bricked over. All of the windows are set in slightly recessed brick panels. Third-floor windows are small three-over-three sash, crowned by splayed stone lintels. The main cornice has classical detailing. The interior of the house has had some alterations, but many Federal period features remain intact.

The house was built c. 1813-15 by Samuel Larkin, an auctioneer who made a fortune selling off assets seized by local privateers during the War of 1812. A period stable and carriage house also survives on the property, while other features, notably a covered way between the house and stable, have been removed.

== See also ==
- National Register of Historic Places listings in Rockingham County, New Hampshire
