= Edward Sewall Garrison =

Historic house in New Hampshire, United States

- U.S. National Register of Historic Places
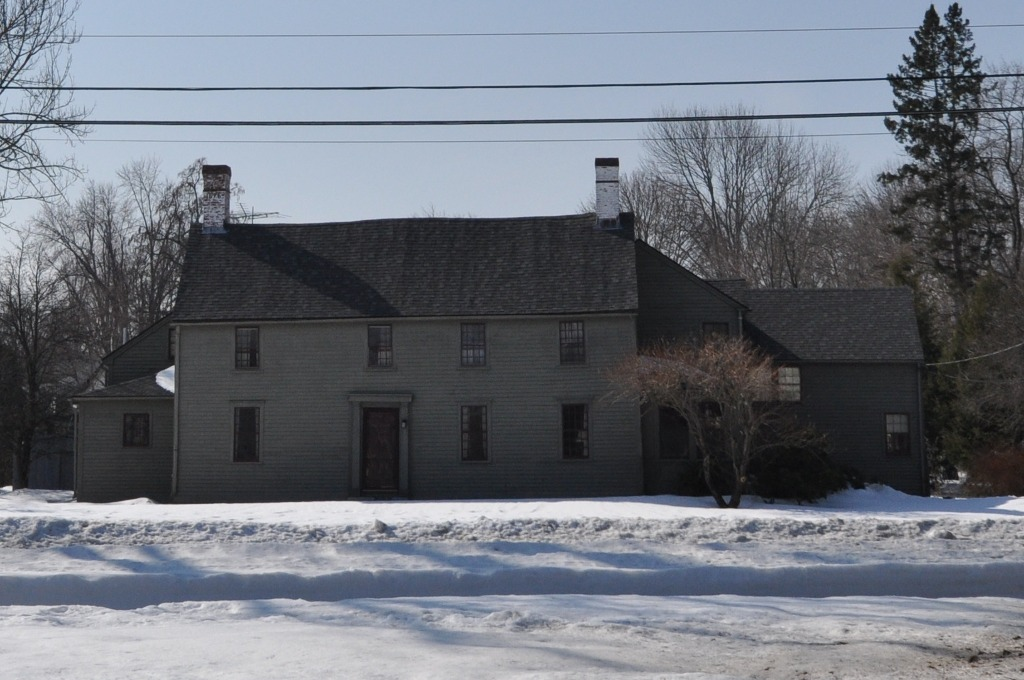

- Location within New Hampshire Location within the United States
- Location: 16 Epping Rd., Exeter, New Hampshire
- Coordinates: 42°59′2″N 70°57′37″W
- Area: 1.8 acres (0.73 ha)
- Built: 1676
- NRHP reference No.: 80000304
- Added to NRHP: January 11, 1980

The Edward Sewall Garrison is a historic house at 16 Epping Road in Exeter, New Hampshire. With a construction history dating to 1676, it is one of New Hampshire's oldest buildings, and is a rare example of a formerly fortified garrison house in its original location. The house was listed on the National Register of Historic Places in 1980.

== Description and history ==
The Edward Sewall Garrison is located in a residential area west of downtown Exeter, on the south side of Epping Road facing the Park Street Common. It is a 2 1/2-story wood-frame structure with a gabled roof and clapboarded exterior. Its main block is four bays wide, arranged slightly asymmetrically, with the main entrance in the center-left bay and interior chimneys at the sides. There are enclosed porches on each side, and ells extending to the rear and the right.

The oldest portion of this house, the northern portion of its main block, is a (formerly) fortified garrison house built in 1676. This section retains evidence of this early history in its walls, which contain evidence of brick infill and small windows typical of the period. The southern portion of the main block was added c. 1730–1751, and includes its original chimney. Additions were added to the rear in 1810 and 1880, the latter adding Victorian woodwork detailing. The house was modernized in 1911, obscuring some details and modernizing others, but later owners have worked to expose the historical elements of the structure. The house is one of the only garrison houses in the state that is in its original location.

== See also ==
- National Register of Historic Places listings in Rockingham County, New Hampshire
