= Franklin Block (Portsmouth, New Hampshire) =

- U.S. National Register of Historic Places
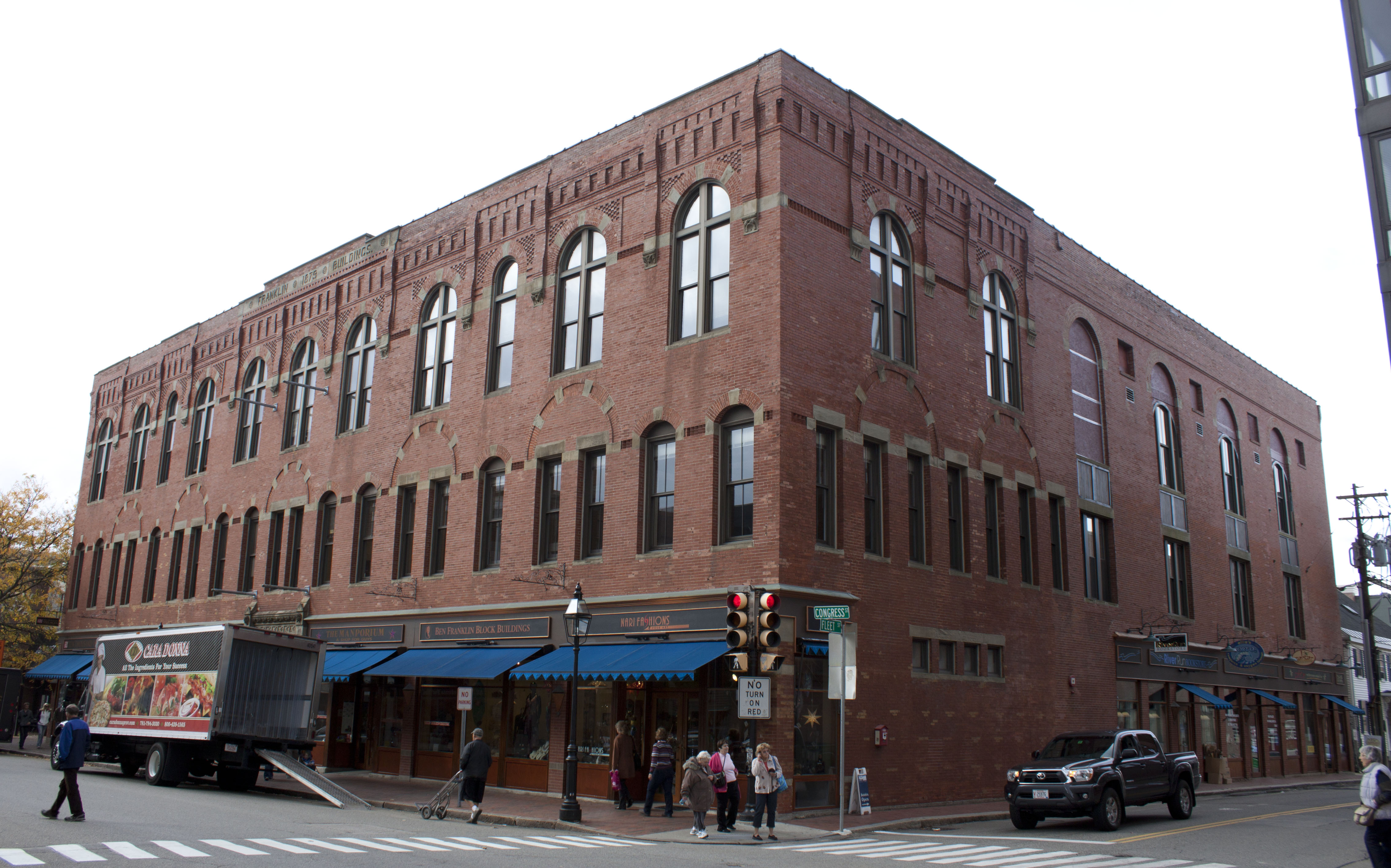

- Location within New Hampshire Location within the United States
- Location: 75 Congress St., Portsmouth, New Hampshire
- Coordinates: 43°4′36″N 70°45′35″W
- Area: 0.5 acres (0.20 ha)
- Built: 1879
- Architect: Vinal, Arthur H.
- Architectural style: Victorian Commercial
- NRHP reference No.: 84003228
- Added to NRHP: June 7, 1984

The Franklin Block is a historic commercial building at 75 Congress Street in downtown Portsmouth, New Hampshire. Built in 1879, this three-story brick building is the largest Victorian-era building standing in the city. It occupies the city block between Fleet Street and Vaughan Mall, a former street that is now a pedestrian mall. It was listed on the National Register of Historic Places in 1984.

== Description and history ==
The Franklin Block is located in downtown Portsmouth, one block west of the city's central Market Square, on the north side of Congress Street at Fleet Street. It is a three-story brick structure, built in a U shape. The main facade, facing Congress Street, is lined with commercial storefronts on the ground floor, separated by brick piers, with the main building entrance near the center, framed by fluted stone pilasters. Second-floor windows are grouped in fours, the outer windows of each group set in segmented-arch openings, and the center two set in rectangular openings topped as a pair by a rounded arch of brick and stone. On the third floor, windows are either singly or in pairs in rounded-arch openings, also formed out of brick and stone. Brick corbelling rises to a shallow parapet at the top of the facade.

The building was designed in 1879 by Boston architect Arthur H. Vinal for Alfred Stavers, a local merchant, and is believed to be the oldest surviving design by Vinal. Built to replace a previous Franklin Hall destroyed by fire, it housed retail spaces facing Congress Street, and meeting halls and performance spaces in the upper floors. These latter spaces were converted to offices c. 1902, but some of the details of the theater interiors have survived. The block was built as part of a gradual westward expansion of the city's downtown in the late 19th century.

== See also ==
- National Register of Historic Places listings in Rockingham County, New Hampshire
