= National Register of Historic Places listings in Rockingham County, New Hampshire =

Location of Rockingham County in New Hampshire

This is a list of the National Register of Historic Places listings in Rockingham County, New Hampshire.

This is intended to be a complete list of the properties and districts on the National Register of Historic Places in Rockingham County, New Hampshire, United States. Latitude and longitude coordinates are provided for many National Register properties and districts; these locations may be seen together in a map.

There are 134 properties and districts listed on the National Register in the county, including 12 National Historic Landmarks.

Contents: Counties in New Hampshire
Belknap - Carroll - Cheshire - Coös - Grafton - Hillsborough - Merrimack - Rockingham - Strafford - Sullivan

This National Park Service list is complete through NPS recent listings posted July 31, 2026.

== Current listings ==
	Name on the Register	Image	Date listed	Location	City or town	Description
1	Adams Memorial Building	Adams Memorial Building	January 11, 1982 (#82001875)	West Broadway; 42°52′48″N 71°19′44″W	Derry	
2	Armstrong Memorial Building	Armstrong Memorial Building	September 11, 2018 (#100002974)	3 N Lowell Rd. 42°48′19″N 71°17′58″W	Windham	
3	Atkinson Academy School	Atkinson Academy School	August 26, 1980 (#80000297)	Academy Ave. 42°50′23″N 71°08′49″W	Atkinson	
4	Atlantic Heights Development	Atlantic Heights Development	September 20, 2006 (#06000869)	Concord, Crescent, Falkland, Kearsarge, Porpoise, Preble, Raleigh, and Saratoga Ways; 43°05′33″N 70°46′22″W	Portsmouth	
5	Josiah Bartlett House	Josiah Bartlett House	November 11, 1971 (#71000050)	Main St. 42°56′11″N 71°03′18″W	Kingston	
6	Bartlett-Cushman House	Bartlett-Cushman House	October 8, 2014 (#14000844)	82 Portsmouth Ave. 43°00′44″N 70°55′02″W	Stratham	
7	The Beach Club	The Beach Club	December 24, 2013 (#13000974)	2450 Ocean Blvd. 42°58′41″N 70°45′55″W	Rye	
8	Samuel Beck House	Samuel Beck House	April 3, 1973 (#73000167)	410 The Hill; 43°04′42″N 70°45′36″W	Portsmouth	
9	Benedict House	Benedict House	May 11, 1973 (#73000168)	30 Middle St. 43°04′31″N 70°45′41″W	Portsmouth	
10	Langley Boardman House		February 2, 2026 (#100012683)	152 Middle Street; 43°04′26″N 70°45′40″W	Portsmouth	
11	Centennial Hall	Centennial Hall	April 5, 2016 (#16000144)	105 Post Rd. 42°58′43″N 70°50′45″W	North Hampton	
12	Chester Congregational Church	Chester Congregational Church	June 5, 1986 (#86001231)	4 Chester St. 42°57′28″N 71°15′27″W	Chester	
13	Chester Village Cemetery	Chester Village Cemetery	November 29, 1979 (#79000203)	NH 102 and NH 121; 42°57′27″N 71°15′22″W	Chester	
14	John Crockett House	John Crockett House	March 24, 1983 (#83001144)	245 Portsmouth Ave. 43°02′26″N 70°53′59″W	Stratham	
15	Capt. Jonathan Currier House	Capt. Jonathan Currier House	April 11, 1983 (#83001145)	Hilldale Ave. 42°52′34″N 71°00′08″W	South Hampton	
16	Dame School	Dame School	October 30, 1980 (#80000298)	NH 152; 43°07′14″N 71°06′10″W	Nottingham	
17	Danville Meetinghouse	Danville Meetinghouse	April 19, 1982 (#82001876)	N. Main St. 42°56′14″N 71°07′08″W	Danville	
18	Danville Town House	Danville Town House	December 1, 2000 (#00001465)	210 Main St., NH 111A; 42°54′54″N 71°07′24″W	Danville	
19	Deerfield Center Historic District	Deerfield Center Historic District	September 14, 2002 (#02000958)	1 Candia Rd., 1-14 Old Center Road South; 43°08′00″N 71°14′37″W	Deerfield	Not to be confused with the Old Deerfield Center Historic District
20	Drake Farm	Drake Farm	September 20, 2016 (#16000645)	148 Lafayette Rd. 42°59′22″N 70°49′20″W	North Hampton	
21	Dudley House	Dudley House	June 21, 1971 (#71000051)	14 Front St. 42°58′49″N 70°56′49″W	Exeter	
22	East Derry Historic District	East Derry Historic District	August 10, 1982 (#82004991)	Roughly bounded by Hampstead, Lane, and Cemetery Rds. 42°53′33″N 71°17′33″W	East Derry	
23	John Elkins Farmstead	John Elkins Farmstead	August 30, 1996 (#96000955)	155 Beach Plain Rd. 42°56′39″N 71°06′07″W	Danville	Listed at 156 Beach Plain Rd.
24	Elm Farm	Elm Farm	January 22, 1988 (#88000191)	599 Main St. 42°56′58″N 71°08′00″W	Danville	
25	Emery Farm	Emery Farm	September 18, 2017 (#100001621)	16 Emery Ln. 43°01′01″N 70°55′01″W	Stratham	
26	Exeter Waterfront Commercial Historic District	Exeter Waterfront Commercial Historic District	December 3, 1980 (#80000299)	Chestnut Hill Ave. and Water, Franklin, Pleasant, High, and Chestnut Sts. 42°58′57″N 70°56′49″W	Exeter	Boundary Increase (added 1986-12-29): Chestnut St.
27	First Church	First Church	September 10, 1971 (#71000052)	21 Front St. 42°58′50″N 70°56′51″W	Exeter	
28	First Universalist Church	First Universalist Church	December 26, 1979 (#79000204)	Main St. 42°56′00″N 71°03′15″W	Kingston	
29	Fort Constitution	Fort Constitution	July 9, 1973 (#73000169)	Walbach St. 43°04′17″N 70°42′37″W	New Castle	
30	Franklin Block	Franklin Block	June 7, 1984 (#84003228)	75 Congress St. 43°04′36″N 70°45′35″W	Portsmouth	
31	Freewill Baptist Church-Peoples Baptist Church-New Hope Church	Freewill Baptist Church-Peoples Baptist Church-New Hope Church	September 13, 2003 (#03000925)	45 Pearl St. 43°04′32″N 70°45′49″W	Portsmouth	
32	Fremont Meeting House	Fremont Meeting House	May 27, 1993 (#93000461)	464 Main St. 42°58′59″N 71°07′44″W	Fremont	
33	Front Street Historic District	Front Street Historic District	July 5, 1973 (#73000270)	Front St. between its junctions with Spring and Water Sts. 42°58′45″N 70°57′04″W	Exeter	
34	Robert Frost Homestead	Robert Frost Homestead	May 23, 1968 (#68000008)	2 mi (3.2 km) southeast of Derry; 42°52′18″N 71°17′40″W	Derry	Home of poet Robert Frost
35	Gilman Garrison House	Gilman Garrison House	September 27, 1976 (#76000131)	12 Water St. 42°58′50″N 70°56′42″W	Exeter	
36	Maj. John Gilman House	Maj. John Gilman House	June 14, 1988 (#88000659)	25 Cass St. 42°59′03″N 70°57′16″W	Exeter	
37	Greeley House	Greeley House	June 16, 1980 (#80000300)	East of East Kingston on NH 108; 42°55′18″N 70°59′43″W	East Kingston	
38	Hampstead Meetinghouse	Hampstead Meetinghouse	April 10, 1980 (#80000301)	Emerson Ave. 42°52′32″N 71°10′48″W	Hampstead	
39	Jeremiah Hart House	Jeremiah Hart House	November 14, 1972 (#72000081)	The Hill; 43°04′43″N 70°45′36″W	Portsmouth	
40	John Hart House	John Hart House	November 14, 1972 (#72000082)	403 The Hill; 43°04′43″N 70°45′37″W	Portsmouth	
41	Phoebe Hart House	Phoebe Hart House	April 2, 1973 (#73000170)	The Hill; 43°04′43″N 70°45′36″W	Portsmouth	
42	Hart-Rice House	Hart-Rice House	August 7, 1972 (#72000083)	408 The Hill; 43°04′43″N 70°45′36″W	Portsmouth	
43	Haven-White House	Haven-White House	June 6, 1985 (#85001195)	229 Pleasant St. 43°04′24″N 70°45′17″W	Portsmouth	
44	Highland Road Historic District	Highland Road Historic District	April 11, 1983 (#83001146)	Highland and Woodman Rds. 42°53′43″N 70°56′05″W	South Hampton	
45	Isles of Shoals	Isles of Shoals	December 10, 1980 (#80000419)	Off the coast 42°58′34″N 70°37′14″W	Rye	Extends into Kittery, Maine
46	Richard Jackson House	Richard Jackson House	November 24, 1968 (#68000009)	Northwest St. 43°04′51″N 70°45′59″W	Portsmouth	Oldest surviving wooden house in New Hampshire, built 1664
47	Benjamin James House	Benjamin James House	March 13, 2002 (#02000168)	186 Towle Farm Rd. 42°56′31″N 70°51′44″W	Hampton	
48	Jewell Town District	Jewell Town District	April 11, 1983 (#83001147)	W. Whitehall Rd. and Jewell St. 42°52′22″N 70°58′08″W	South Hampton	
49	John Paul Jones House	John Paul Jones House	November 28, 1972 (#72000084)	Middle and State Sts. 43°04′31″N 70°45′39″W	Portsmouth	American Revolutionary War naval hero John Paul Jones boarded here in 1781-82, while supervising construction of a new battleship, the America.
50	Kensington Social Library	Kensington Social Library	March 27, 2020 (#100005160)	126 Amesbury Rd. 42°55′42″N 70°56′37″W	Kensington	
51	Kensington Town Center Historic District	Kensington Town Center Historic District	April 9, 2013 (#100010487)	Amesbury Road (NH Route 150); 42°55′39″N 70°56′36″W	Kensington	
52	Kensington Town House	Kensington Town House	April 9, 2013 (#13000155)	95 Amesbury Rd. 42°55′54″N 70°56′43″W	Kensington	
53	Ladd-Gilman House	Ladd-Gilman House	December 2, 1974 (#74002055)	Governors Lane and Water St. 42°58′54″N 70°56′57″W	Exeter	Now part of the American Independence Museum
54	Reuben Lamprey Homestead	Reuben Lamprey Homestead	November 9, 1982 (#82000624)	416 Winnacunnet Rd. 42°55′51″N 70°48′46″W	Hampton	
55	Deacon Samuel and Jabez Lane Homestead	Deacon Samuel and Jabez Lane Homestead	April 8, 1983 (#83001148)	Portsmouth Ave. 43°01′22″N 70°55′00″W	Stratham	
56	Gov. John Langdon Mansion	Gov. John Langdon Mansion	December 2, 1974 (#74000197)	143 Pleasant St. 43°04′31″N 70°45′23″W	Portsmouth	Great Georgian house built in 1784, home of John Langdon
57	Larkin-Rice House	Larkin-Rice House	November 29, 1979 (#79000205)	180 Middle St. 43°04′24″N 70°45′43″W	Portsmouth	
58	Little Boar's Head Historic District	Little Boar's Head Historic District	June 3, 1999 (#99000668)	Parts of Atlantic Ave., Chapel Rd., Ocean Blvd., Sea Rd., and Willow Ave. 42°57′36″N 70°46′45″W	North Hampton	
59	Elijah Locke House	Elijah Locke House	December 19, 1979 (#79000206)	5 Grove Rd. 42°59′45″N 70°46′29″W	Rye	
60	MacPheadris-Warner House	MacPheadris-Warner House	October 15, 1966 (#66000028)	Chapel and Daniel Sts. 43°04′41″N 70°45′18″W	Portsmouth	
61	Richman Margeson Estate	Richman Margeson Estate	June 21, 1990 (#90000873)	Long Point Rd. near Great Bay shore 43°04′45″N 70°51′29″W	Newington	Now in the Great Bay National Wildlife Refuge; no public access as of 2012
62	Moffatt-Ladd House	Moffatt-Ladd House	November 24, 1968 (#68000010)	154 Market St. 43°04′44″N 70°45′32″W	Portsmouth	
63	Moses-Kent House	Moses-Kent House	September 12, 1985 (#85002184)	1 Pine St. 42°58′36″N 70°57′18″W	Exeter	
64	James Neal House	James Neal House	August 7, 1972 (#72000112)	74 Deer St. 43°04′44″N 70°45′37″W	Portsmouth	
65	New Castle Congregational Church	New Castle Congregational Church	February 2, 2015 (#14001241)	65 Main St. 43°04′16″N 70°42′59″W	New Castle	
66	New Hampshire Bank Building	New Hampshire Bank Building	September 10, 1979 (#79000207)	22-26 Market Sq. 43°04′37″N 70°45′27″W	Portsmouth	
67	Newington Center Historic District	Newington Center Historic District	November 30, 1987 (#87002106)	272-336, 305-353 Nimble Hill Rd.; also Merrimac Drive, north of Short St. 43°05′58″N 70°50′00″W	Newington	Second set of addresses represents a boundary increase
68	Newington Railroad Depot	Newington Railroad Depot	April 19, 2010 (#10000187)	Bloody Point Rd. 43°07′00″N 70°49′15″W	Newington	
69	Newmarket Industrial and Commercial Historic District	Newmarket Industrial and Commercial Historic District	December 1, 1980 (#80000302)	NH 108; 43°04′47″N 70°56′14″W	Newmarket	
70	Nichols Memorial Library	Nichols Memorial Library	January 28, 1981 (#81000076)	Main St. 42°56′12″N 71°03′12″W	Kingston	
71	North Hampton Library	North Hampton Library	February 5, 2014 (#13001149)	237 Atlantic Ave. 42°58′24″N 70°49′50″W	North Hampton	
72	North Hampton Town Hall	North Hampton Town Hall	February 13, 2013 (#13000006)	231 Atlantic Ave. 42°58′24″N 70°49′46″W	North Hampton	
73	North School	North School	February 13, 2013 (#13000007)	63 Amesbury Rd. 42°56′22″N 70°56′58″W	Kensington	
74	Northwood Congregational Church	Northwood Congregational Church	November 30, 1979 (#79000208)	U.S. Route 4; 43°13′02″N 71°12′32″W	Northwood	
75	Nutter-Rymes House	Nutter-Rymes House	November 3, 1972 (#72000085)	409 The Hill; 43°04′42″N 70°45′36″W	Portsmouth	
76	Old Deerfield Center Historic District	Old Deerfield Center Historic District	April 6, 2020 (#100005162)	51, 58, 68, 70 Church St.; 23 Lang Rd.; 49, 51, 53 Meetinghouse Hill Rd.; 8, 20, 24, Mt. Delight Rd.; Cemetery, north side of Meetinghouse Hill Rd. 43°08′42″N 71°15′14″W	Deerfield	Not to be confused with the Deerfield Center Historic District
77	Old North Cemetery	Old North Cemetery	March 8, 1978 (#78000218)	Maplewood Ave. 43°04′41″N 70°45′48″W	Portsmouth	
78	Parsons Homestead	Parsons Homestead	December 5, 1980 (#80000420)	520 Washington Rd. 43°00′49″N 70°46′14″W	Rye	
79	Daniel Pinkham House	Daniel Pinkham House	November 3, 1972 (#72000086)	400 The Hill; 43°04′43″N 70°45′38″W	Portsmouth	
80	Plains Cemetery		December 27, 2021 (#100007290)	Cemetery Ln. 42°56′02″N 71°03′08″W	Kingston	
81	Plaistow Carhouse		December 10, 1980 (#80000303)	27 Elm St. 42°50′21″N 71°05′33″W	Plaistow	Demolished around 1985
82	General Porter House	General Porter House	October 11, 1985 (#85003359)	32-34 Livermore St. 43°04′24″N 70°45′16″W	Portsmouth	
83	Portsmouth Athenaeum	Portsmouth Athenaeum	May 24, 1973 (#73000171)	9 Market Sq. 43°04′37″N 70°45′29″W	Portsmouth	
84	Portsmouth Cottage Hospital	Portsmouth Cottage Hospital	September 13, 1996 (#96000954)	Junkins Ave., southern side of South Mill Pond; 43°04′14″N 70°45′17″W	Portsmouth	
85	Portsmouth Downtown Historic District	Portsmouth Downtown Historic District	June 19, 2017 (#16000820)	Downtown Portsmouth; 43°04′37″N 70°45′27″W	Portsmouth	
86	Portsmouth Harbor Light	Portsmouth Harbor Light	October 8, 2009 (#09000816)	0.3 miles (0.48 km) east of the Route 1B junction with Wentworth Rd., at the southeastern corner of Fort Constitution; 43°04′16″N 70°42′31″W	New Castle	
87	Portsmouth Public Library	Portsmouth Public Library	March 20, 1973 (#73000172)	8 Islington St. 43°04′31″N 70°45′41″W	Portsmouth	Listing is for old library building, formerly the Portsmouth Academy, now Discover Portsmouth
88	Benjamin Franklin Prescott House	Benjamin Franklin Prescott House	December 3, 1987 (#87002069)	Prescott Rd. 43°03′02″N 71°05′55″W	Epping	
89	Pulpit Rock Base-End Station (N. 142)	Pulpit Rock Base-End Station (N. 142)	April 16, 2010 (#10000188)	9 Davis Rd. 43°02′00″N 70°43′10″W	Rye	
90	Raymond Boston and Maine Railroad Depot	Raymond Boston and Maine Railroad Depot	May 16, 1979 (#79000209)	Main St. 43°02′09″N 71°10′53″W	Raymond	
91	Rockingham Hotel	Rockingham Hotel	March 11, 1982 (#82001693)	401 State St. 43°04′31″N 70°45′34″W	Portsmouth	
92	George Rogers House	George Rogers House	June 7, 1976 (#76000132)	76 Northwest St. 43°04′53″N 70°46′00″W	Portsmouth	
93	Rundlet-May House	Rundlet-May House	June 7, 1976 (#76000133)	364 Middle St. 43°04′16″N 70°45′47″W	Portsmouth	
94	Rye Town Hall	Rye Town Hall	October 29, 2020 (#100005705)	10 Central Rd. 43°00′37″N 70°46′25″W	Rye	
95	St. Andrew's-by-the-Sea	St. Andrew's-by-the-Sea	December 13, 2001 (#01001352)	Church Rd., 0.2 mi (0.32 km) southwest of its junction with South Rd. and NH 1A; 42°58′27″N 70°46′02″W	Rye	
96	St. John's Church	St. John's Church	January 31, 1978 (#78000417)	105 Chapel St. 43°04′42″N 70°45′20″W	Portsmouth	
97	Salem Common Historic District	Salem Common Historic District	April 15, 2011 (#11000190)	304, 310, 312 Main St. 42°47′22″N 71°12′01″W	Salem	
98	Sanborn Seminary	Sanborn Seminary	March 15, 1984 (#84003233)	178 Main St. 42°56′21″N 71°03′16″W	Kingston	
99	Sandown Depot, Boston and Maine Railroad	Sandown Depot, Boston and Maine Railroad	September 4, 1986 (#86002167)	Depot Rd. 42°55′46″N 71°11′08″W	Sandown	
100	Sandown Old Meetinghouse	Sandown Old Meetinghouse	August 9, 1978 (#78000219)	Fremont Rd. 42°55′58″N 71°11′10″W	Sandown	
101	Scamman Farm	Scamman Farm	April 4, 2019 (#100003597)	69 Portsmouth Ave. 43°00′33″N 70°55′07″W	Stratham	
102	Scammon Farm Historic District		October 10, 2023 (#100009402)	21–25 River Road; 43°00′07″N 70°55′42″W	Stratham	
103	Searles School and Chapel	Searles School and Chapel	January 11, 1982 (#82001694)	Range and Searles Rds. 42°48′31″N 71°15′27″W	Windham	
104	Edward Sewall Garrison	Edward Sewall Garrison	January 11, 1980 (#80000304)	16 Epping Rd. 42°59′02″N 70°57′37″W	Exeter	
105	Shapley Town House	Shapley Town House	February 28, 1973 (#73000173)	454-456 Court St. 43°04′37″N 70°45′14″W	Portsmouth	
106	Henry Sherburne House	Henry Sherburne House	August 7, 1972 (#72000087)	62 Deer St., The Hill; 43°04′43″N 70°45′37″W	Portsmouth	
107	Smith's Corner Historic District	Smith's Corner Historic District	April 11, 1983 (#83001149)	Main Ave., South, Stagecoach, and Chase Rds. 42°53′28″N 70°59′30″W	South Hampton	
108	Simeon P. Smith House	Simeon P. Smith House	November 14, 1972 (#72000088)	154 High St., The Hill; 43°04′43″N 70°45′35″W	Portsmouth	
109	Smyth Public Library	Smyth Public Library	September 13, 2007 (#07000948)	194 High St. 43°03′47″N 71°18′10″W	Candia	
110	South Meetinghouse	South Meetinghouse	April 19, 1982 (#82001695)	Marcy St. and Meeting House Hill; 43°04′29″N 70°45′10″W	Portsmouth	
111	South Parish	South Parish	August 21, 1979 (#79000210)	292 State St. 43°04′32″N 70°45′29″W	Portsmouth	
112	Square Schoolhouse	Square Schoolhouse	April 17, 1980 (#80000305)	NH 156 and Ledge Farm Rd. 43°06′11″N 71°06′34″W	Nottingham	
113	Stevens Memorial Hall	Stevens Memorial Hall	September 10, 2004 (#04000963)	Junction of NH 102 and NH 121; 42°57′25″N 71°15′29″W	Chester	
114	Stone School	Stone School	July 12, 1978 (#78000418)	Granite St. 43°04′44″N 70°56′18″W	Newmarket	Now houses the local historical society museum
115	Strawbery Banke Historic District	Strawbery Banke Historic District	June 20, 1975 (#75000236)	Bounded by Court and Marcy Sts. and both sides of Hancock and Washington Sts. 43°04′33″N 70°45′14″W	Portsmouth	
116	Samuel Tenney House	Samuel Tenney House	November 25, 1980 (#80000306)	65 High St. 42°58′49″N 70°56′23″W	Exeter	
117	Matthew Thornton House	Matthew Thornton House	November 11, 1971 (#71000053)	2 Thornton St. 42°53′38″N 71°18′46″W	Derry Village	
118	Town Center Historic District	Town Center Historic District	April 11, 1983 (#83001150)	Main and Hilldale Aves. and Jewell St. 42°52′52″N 70°57′47″W	South Hampton	
119	Town House	Town House	April 17, 1980 (#80000307)	Old Centre Rd. 43°07′59″N 71°14′37″W	Deerfield	
120	Union Meetinghouse-Universalist Church	Union Meetinghouse-Universalist Church	February 13, 2013 (#13000008)	97 Amesbury Rd. 42°55′53″N 70°56′43″W	Kensington	
121	Unitarian Church	Unitarian Church	December 13, 1984 (#84000558)	Exeter Rd. 42°56′00″N 70°53′23″W	Hampton Falls	
122	USS ALBACORE	USS ALBACORE	April 11, 1989 (#89001077)	Portsmouth Maritime Museum; 43°04′58″N 70°46′00″W	Portsmouth	
123	Watson Academy	Watson Academy	November 9, 1982 (#82000625)	Academy St. 43°02′36″N 71°04′33″W	Epping	
124	Gov. Meshech Weare House	Gov. Meshech Weare House	June 29, 1973 (#73000174)	Exeter Rd. (NH 88); 42°55′02″N 70°52′00″W	Hampton Falls	
125	Weeks House	Weeks House	June 20, 1975 (#75000131)	Weeks Ave. off NH 33; 43°02′16″N 70°50′26″W	Greenland	
126	Gov. John Wentworth House	Gov. John Wentworth House	June 29, 1973 (#73000175)	346 Pleasant St. 43°04′25″N 70°45′14″W	Portsmouth	Also known as the Mark Wentworth House
127	Wentworth-Coolidge Mansion	Wentworth-Coolidge Mansion	November 24, 1968 (#68000011)	2 mi (3.2 km) south of Portsmouth, off NH 1A; 43°03′42″N 70°44′20″W	Portsmouth	
128	Wentworth-Gardner and Tobias Lear Houses	Wentworth-Gardner and Tobias Lear Houses	October 30, 1979 (#79000319)	Mechanic and Gardner Sts. 43°04′28″N 70°45′02″W	Portsmouth	
129	Wentworth-Gardner House	Wentworth-Gardner House	November 24, 1968 (#68000012)	140 Mechanic St. 43°04′28″N 70°45′02″W	Portsmouth	
130	Whidden-Ward House	Whidden-Ward House	November 5, 1971 (#71000077)	411 High St. (The Hill); 43°04′43″N 70°45′34″W	Portsmouth	
131	Wiggin Memorial Library	Wiggin Memorial Library	December 10, 1993 (#93001381)	158 Portsmouth Ave. 43°01′30″N 70°54′42″W	Stratham	Now houses the Stratham Historical Society
132	Cornet Thomas Wiggin House	Cornet Thomas Wiggin House	March 24, 1983 (#83001151)	249 Portsmouth Ave. 43°02′27″N 70°53′56″W	Stratham	
133	Woodman Road Historic District	Woodman Road Historic District	April 11, 1983 (#83001152)	Woodman Rd. 42°53′11″N 70°56′21″W	South Hampton	
134	Gen. Mason J. Young House	Gen. Mason J. Young House	February 27, 1986 (#86000281)	4 Young Rd. 42°50′41″N 71°21′56″W	Londonderry	

== Former listings ==
Two properties in the county have been de-listed from the register:

	Name on the Register	Image	Date listed	Date removed	Location	City or town	Description
1	Portsmouth Parade Historic District	Portsmouth Parade Historic District	March 24, 1972 (#72001570)	June 27, 1975	along Deer & High Sts. 43°04′43″N 70°45′36″W	Portsmouth	Grouping of 14 structures, many of which are individually NRHP-listed, created during the Vaughn Street Area Urban Renewal Project
2	Joshua Wentworth House	Joshua Wentworth House	July 2, 1971 (#71001097)	April 18, 1975	119 Hanover St. 43°04′39″N 70°45′37″W	Portsmouth	Relocated in 1973 via barge to Hancock Street, during the Vaughn Street Area Urban Renewal Project. The house is now listed as a contributing resource for the Strawbery Banke Historic District.

== See also ==
- List of National Historic Landmarks in New Hampshire
- National Register of Historic Places listings in New Hampshire
