= National Register of Historic Places listings in Darlington County, South Carolina =

Location of Darlington County in South Carolina

This is a list of items on the National Register of Historic Places listings in Darlington County, South Carolina.

This is intended to be a complete list of the properties and districts on the National Register of Historic Places in Darlington County, South Carolina, United States. The locations of National Register properties and districts for which the latitude and longitude coordinates are included below, may be seen in a map.

There are 52 properties and districts listed on the National Register in the county, including one National Historic Landmark. There is also one former listing.

This National Park Service list is complete through NPS recent listings posted May 1, 2026.

== Current listings ==
	Name on the Register	Image	Date listed	Location	City or town	Description
1	Arcade Hotel	Arcade Hotel	December 19, 1986 (#86003467)	204 N. 5th St. 34°22′30″N 80°04′28″W	Hartsville	
2	W.E. Cannon House and Store	W.E. Cannon House and Store	May 3, 1991 (#91000470)	612 W. Home Ave. 34°22′19″N 80°05′18″W	Hartsville	
3	Cashua Street-Spring Street Historic District	Cashua Street-Spring Street Historic District	February 10, 1988 (#88000064)	Cashua St. between Columbian St. and Warley St., and Spring St. between Cashua St. and N. Ervin St. 34°18′25″N 79°52′01″W	Darlington	
4	Coker Experimental Farms	Coker Experimental Farms	October 15, 1966 (#66000706)	West of Hartsville on South Carolina Highway 151; 34°21′47″N 80°03′35″W	Hartsville	National Historic Landmark
5	J.L. Coker Company Building	J.L. Coker Company Building	February 9, 1983 (#83002192)	5th St. and Carolina Ave. 34°22′27″N 80°04′22″W	Hartsville	
6	James L. Coker III House		May 3, 1991 (#91000471)	620 W. Home Ave. 34°22′18″N 80°05′20″W	Hartsville	
7	Robert R. Coker House	Robert R. Coker House	September 8, 1994 (#94001130)	1318 W. Carolina Ave. 34°22′01″N 80°06′22″W	Hartsville	
8	S. Pressly Coker House		September 8, 1994 (#94001131)	402 W. Home Ave. 34°22′16″N 80°04′52″W	Hartsville	
9	Julius A. Dargan House	Julius A. Dargan House	February 10, 1988 (#88000036)	488 Pearl St. 34°18′00″N 79°52′38″W	Darlington	
10	Darlington Downtown Historic District	Darlington Downtown Historic District	July 5, 2006 (#06000546)	Along portions of S. Main St., Pearl St., Public Sq., and Exchange St. 34°18′10″N 79°52′17″W	Darlington	
11	Darlington Industrial Historic District		February 10, 1988 (#88000062)	Roughly bounded by 6th St., Ave. B, Dargan St., and Siskron St. 34°18′01″N 79°51′54″W	Darlington	
12	Darlington Memorial Cemetery		June 9, 2005 (#05000576)	Ave. D and Friendship St. 34°17′34″N 79°51′22″W	Darlington	
13	Darlington Theatre		May 30, 2024 (#100010415)	108 Pearl Street; 34°18′09″N 79°52′18″W	Darlington	
14	Davidson Hall, Coker College	Davidson Hall, Coker College	November 10, 1983 (#83003835)	College Ave. 34°22′38″N 80°04′05″W	Hartsville	
15	Edmund H. Deas House	Edmund H. Deas House	February 10, 1988 (#88000045)	229 Ave. E 34°17′44″N 79°51′46″W	Darlington	
16	Dove Dale		February 22, 2007 (#07000075)	Address Restricted	Darlington	
17	C.K. Dunlap House		May 3, 1991 (#91000472)	1346 W. Carolina Ave. 34°22′32″N 80°06′30″W	Hartsville	
18	East Home Avenue Historic District	East Home Avenue Historic District	May 3, 1991 (#91000475)	Roughly E. Home Ave. from N. 5th St. to just east of 1st Ave. 34°22′45″N 80°04′14″W	Hartsville	
19	First Baptist Church	First Baptist Church	October 17, 1991 (#88000061)	246 S. Main St. 34°17′59″N 79°52′12″W	Darlington	
20	J.B. Gilbert House	J.B. Gilbert House	May 3, 1991 (#91000473)	200 Fairfield Terrace; 34°22′48″N 80°04′26″W	Hartsville	
21	Arthur Goodson House		October 10, 1985 (#85003137)	West of County Road 133; 34°20′42″N 79°51′14″W	Springville	
22	John L. Hart House	John L. Hart House	November 10, 1983 (#83003843)	Home Ave. 34°22′36″N 80°04′26″W	Hartsville	
23	John L. Hart House		October 10, 1985 (#85003138)	East of County Road 133; 34°20′42″N 79°51′07″W	Springville	
24	Thomas E. Hart House	Thomas E. Hart House	May 3, 1991 (#91000474)	624 W. Carolina Ave. 34°22′01″N 80°06′57″W	Hartsville	
25	Hartsville Armory	Hartsville Armory	September 8, 1994 (#94001128)	539 W. Carolina Ave. 34°22′09″N 80°05′06″W	Hartsville	
26	Hartsville Community Center-Hartsville Community Market	Hartsville Community Center-Hartsville Community Market	June 4, 1997 (#97000538)	5th St. between College and Home Ave., and 106 W. College Ave. 34°22′32″N 80°04′28″W	Hartsville	
27	Hartsville Passenger Station	Hartsville Passenger Station	June 29, 1976 (#76001700)	114 S. 4th St. 34°22′24″N 80°04′26″W	Hartsville	
28	Hartsville Post Office	Hartsville Post Office	June 4, 1997 (#97000537)	Junction of Home Ave. and 5th St. 34°22′33″N 80°04′29″W	Hartsville	
29	Wade Hampton Hicks House	Wade Hampton Hicks House	September 8, 1994 (#94001127)	313 W. Home Ave. 34°22′26″N 80°04′47″W	Hartsville	
30	Nelson Hudson House		February 10, 1988 (#88000039)	521 Pearl St.** 34°17′56″N 79°52′40″W	Darlington	**house since moved from original location to unknown site
31	Japonica Hall		December 21, 1989 (#89002153)	S. Main St. 34°30′21″N 79°51′35″W	Society Hill	
32	Jacob Kelley House		May 6, 1971 (#71000768)	West of Hartsville on S-16-12; 34°20′59″N 80°08′45″W	Hartsville	
33	Lawton Park and Pavilion	Lawton Park and Pavilion	May 3, 1991 (#91000476)	Prestwood Dr. at its junction with Lanier Dr. 34°22′55″N 80°04′48″W	Hartsville	
34	John W. Lide House		October 10, 1985 (#85003140)	West of County Road 133; 34°21′09″N 79°51′34″W	Springville	
35	Lydia Plantation	Lydia Plantation	May 28, 2010 (#10000299)	703 W Lydia Hwy (US HWY 15/SC HWY 34); 34°17′28″N 80°06′18″W	Lydia	
36	Magnolia Cemetery	Magnolia Cemetery	September 8, 1994 (#94001133)	S. Cedar Ln. 34°21′52″N 80°05′28″W	Hartsville	
37	Manne Building	Manne Building	February 10, 1988 (#88000044)	129 Pearl St. 34°18′08″N 79°52′18″W	Darlington	
38	Clarence McCall House	Clarence McCall House	February 10, 1988 (#88000058)	870 Cashua St. 34°18′35″N 79°51′46″W	Darlington	
39	Charles S. McCullough House	Charles S. McCullough House	February 10, 1988 (#88000060)	480 Pearl St. 34°18′01″N 79°52′36″W	Darlington	
40	A.M. McNair House	A.M. McNair House	September 8, 1994 (#94001126)	153 W. Home Ave. 34°22′31″N 80°04′35″W	Hartsville	
41	Memorial Hall	Memorial Hall	February 9, 1989 (#89000001)	2nd St. between Home Ave. and Carolina Ave. 34°22′42″N 80°04′01″W	Hartsville	
42	Oaklyn Plantation		February 2, 1995 (#94001630)	Junction of S. Charleston Rd. (South Carolina Highway 35) and Pocket Rd. (South Carolina Highway 173); 34°16′46″N 79°46′52″W	Darlington	
43	Paul H. Rogers House	Paul H. Rogers House	September 8, 1994 (#94001125)	628 W. Home Ave. 34°22′17″N 80°05′22″W	Hartsville	
44	St. John's Historic District		September 4, 1980 (#80003668)	Park, St. John's, Sanders, and Orange Sts. 34°18′15″N 79°52′32″W	Darlington	
45	South Carolina Western Railway Station	South Carolina Western Railway Station	February 10, 1988 (#88000040)	129 Russell St. 34°18′13″N 79°52′08″W	Darlington	
46	Welsh Neck-Long Bluff-Society Hill Historic District		December 16, 1974 (#74001846)	Southwest of Bennettsville along U.S. Route 15; 34°31′35″N 79°49′39″W	Bennettsville	
47	West Broad Street Historic District		February 10, 1988 (#88000063)	W. Broad St. between Dargan St. and Player St. 34°17′49″N 79°52′26″W	Darlington	
48	West College Avenue Historic District		September 8, 1994 (#94001123)	W. College Ave. from 6th Ave. to west of 8th Ave. 34°22′24″N 80°04′43″W	Hartsville	
49	White Plains		October 10, 1985 (#85003141)	North of County Road 177 and northeast of County Road 389; 34°21′24″N 79°53′00″W	Springville	
50	Wilds Hall		October 10, 1985 (#85003142)	West of County Road 228 off South Carolina Highway 34; 34°19′05″N 79°50′33″W	Springville	
51	Wilds-Edwards House	Wilds-Edwards House	February 10, 1988 (#88000034)	120 Edwards Ave. 34°17′54″N 79°52′33″W	Darlington	
52	Mrs. B.F. Williamson House	Mrs. B.F. Williamson House	February 10, 1988 (#88000059)	141 Oak St. 34°18′24″N 79°52′17″W	Darlington	

== Former listings ==
	Name on the Register	Image	Date listed	Date removed	Location	City or town	Description
1	Evan J. Lide House		October 10, 1985 (#85003139)	July 15, 2025	West of County Road 228 northwest of South Carolina Highway 34; 34°19′46″N 79°50′57″W	Springville	

== See also ==
- List of National Historic Landmarks in South Carolina
- National Register of Historic Places listings in South Carolina
