= Center Theatre =

Center Theater or Center Theatre may refer to:

- Center Theatre (New York City), a former theater
- Center Theatre (Woodbourne, New York)
- Center Theater (Norfolk, Virginia), now the Harrison Opera House
- Center Theater (Little Rock, Arkansas), listed on the National Register of Historic Places in Pulaski County, Arkansas
- Center Theater (Hartsville, South Carolina), listed on the National Register of Historic Places in Darlington County, South Carolina
- Center Theatre (Dover-Foxcroft), a performing arts center in Dover-Foxcroft, Maine

== See also ==
- Center Theatre Group, Los Angeles theatre organization
