= Robert R. Coker House =

Historic house in South Carolina, United States

- U.S. National Register of Historic Places
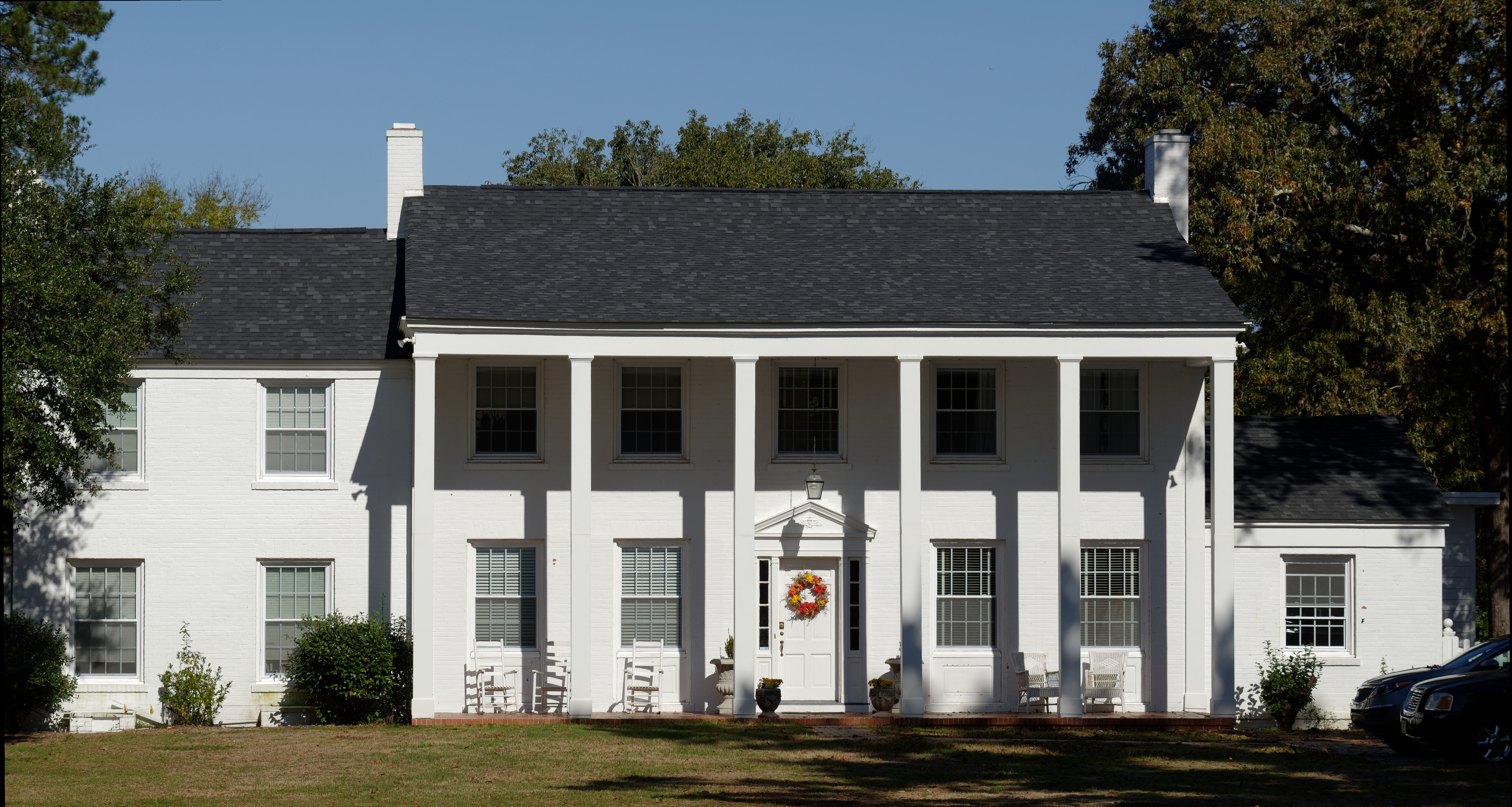

- Location within South Carolina Location within the United States
- Location: 1318 W. Carolina Ave., Hartsville, South Carolina
- Coordinates: 34.36686°N 80.10611°W
- Area: 3 acres (1.2 ha)
- Built: 1938, 1942
- Architect: Oliver, C. Hardy
- Architectural style: Colonial Revival
- MPS: Hartsville MPS
- NRHP reference No.: 94001130
- Added to NRHP: September 8, 1994

Robert R. Coker House is a historic home located at Hartsville, Darlington County, South Carolina. It was built in 1938, and is a two-story, five-bay, brick Colonial Revival style residence. About 1942, a two-story wing was added to the west elevation and a one-story wing was added to the east elevation. It features an engaged two-story portico supported by six slender square columns. It was the home of Robert R. Coker (1905-1987), prominent Hartsville agriculturalist and businessman who served as president of J.L. Coker and Company and the Coker Pedigreed Seed Company.

It was listed on the National Register of Historic Places in 1994.
