= Kalmia Gardens =

Botanical garden in Hartsville, South Carolina, United States

Coordinates: 34.3661°N 80.1164°W

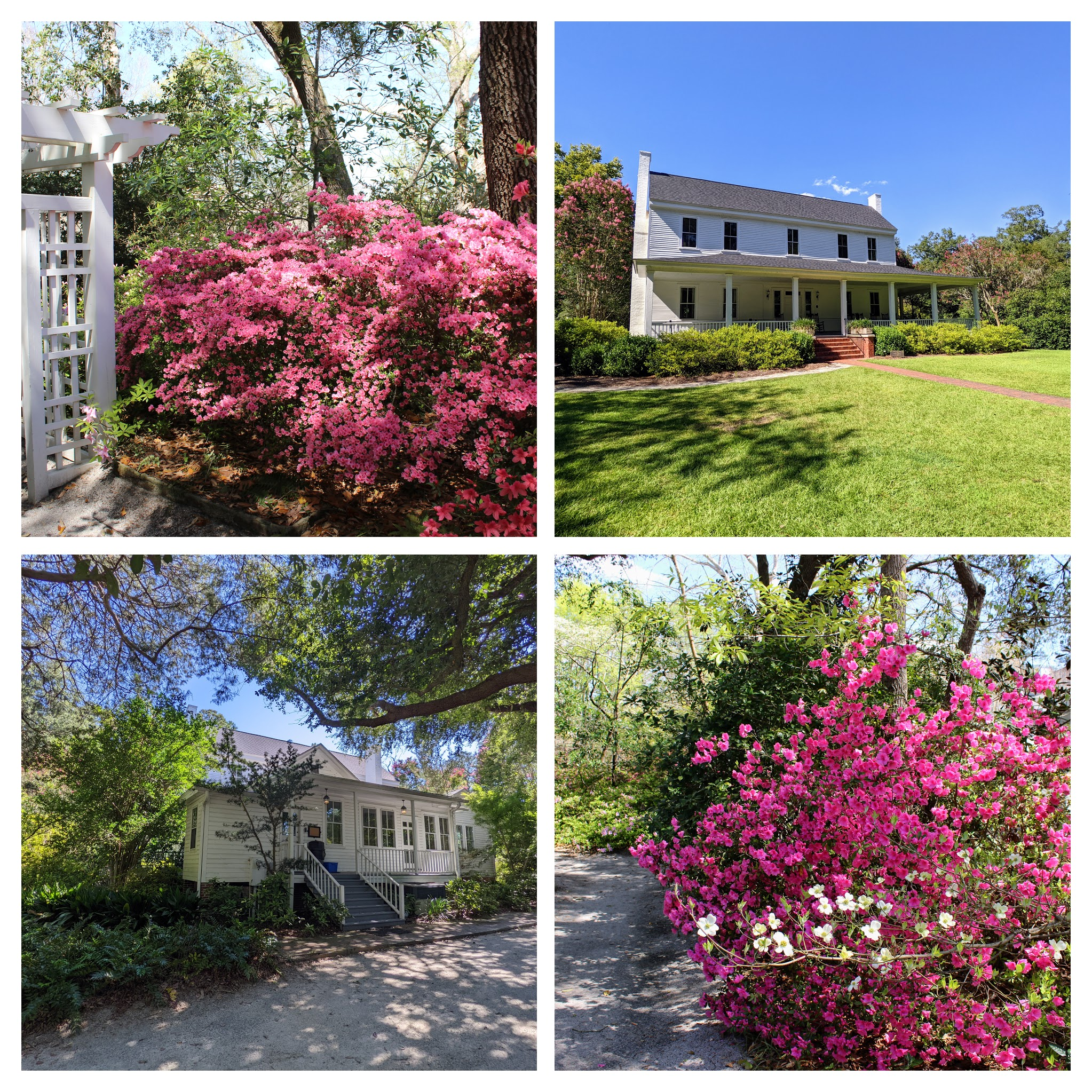
- Interactive map of Kalmia Gardens
- Location: 1624 West Carolina Avenue, Hartsville, South Carolina
- Area: 30 acres (12 ha)
- Opened: 1930s
- Founder: Mrs. David R. Coker
- Owner: Coker College
- Website: www.kalmiagardens.org

Kalmia Gardens (30 acres) is a mature botanical garden located at 1624 West Carolina Avenue, Hartsville, South Carolina. Part of Coker University, it is open daily without admission.

The gardens were established in the early 1930s by Mrs. David R. Coker on the land, which had become a neglected dump. Mrs. Coker made trails, dug a pond, and planted ornamental species including azaleas, camellias, tea olives (Osmanthus fragrans), and wisteria. In 1935 she opened the gardens to the public, and in 1965 she gave them to Coker University. The centerpiece of the gardens is the Thomas Hart House, built in the 1820s, and the home of the town's founder. It and the gardens are on the National Register of Historic Places.

Kalmia Gardens encompasses a blackwater swamp along Black Creek, and uplands of pine, oak, and holly. Due to its unique geology, being situated on a 60-foot north-facing bluff, it has an abundance of naturally occurring mountain-laurel Kalmia latifolia. The namesake plant blooms in great profusion in May. Other montane plants grow together with coastal plain plants, making for a unique assemblage of flora. Many animal species live in the dense woodlands as well, and Kalmia Gardens is well known as an excellent birding spot. There is also an artesian well located just beyond the entrance to the trails.

== See also ==
- List of botanical gardens in the United States
