= Hartsville Community Center-Hartsville Community Market =

Historic building in South Carolina, US

- U.S. National Register of Historic Places
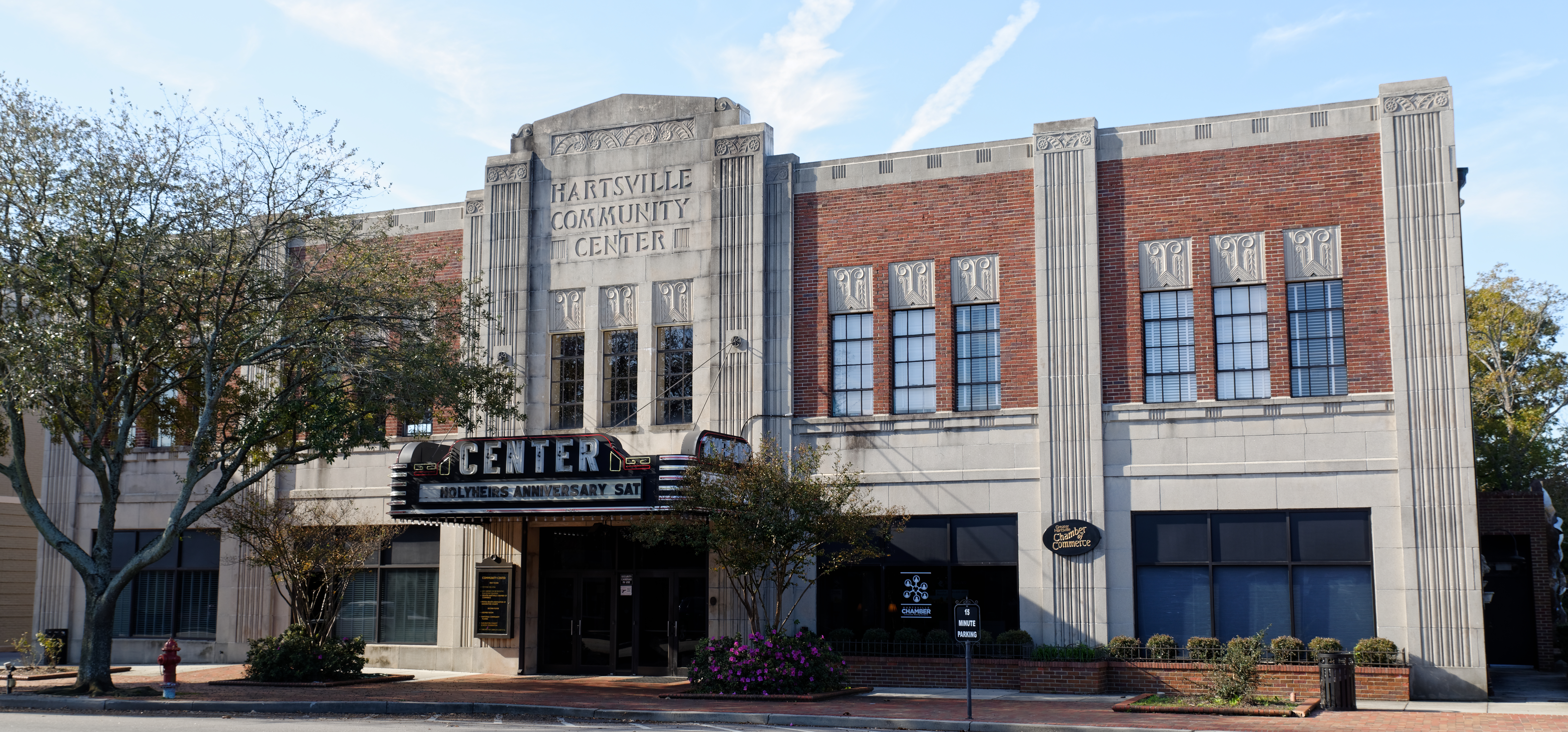

- Location within South Carolina Location within the United States
- Location: Fifth St. between College and Homes Ave.; and 106 W. College Ave., Hartsville, South Carolina
- Coordinates: 34°22′32″N 80°4′28″W
- Area: less than one acre
- Built: 1936
- Built by: Wheatley and Mobley
- Architect: Lafaye and Lafaye
- Architectural style: Art Deco
- MPS: Hartsville MPS
- NRHP reference No.: 97000538
- Added to NRHP: June 4, 1997

Hartsville Community Center-Hartsville Community Market is a historic community center and public market complex located at Hartsville, Darlington County, South Carolina. It was built in 1935-1936 utilizing federal loans from the Public Works Administration. The Hartsville Community Center is a two-story, five-bay, rectangular plan Art Deco style brick building with a flat roof, parapet, and decorative cast-stone trim.

It was listed on the National Register of Historic Places in 1997.
