= H. B. Robinson Nuclear Generating Station =

Nuclear power plant located near Hartsville, South Carolina

Robinson Nuclear Plant
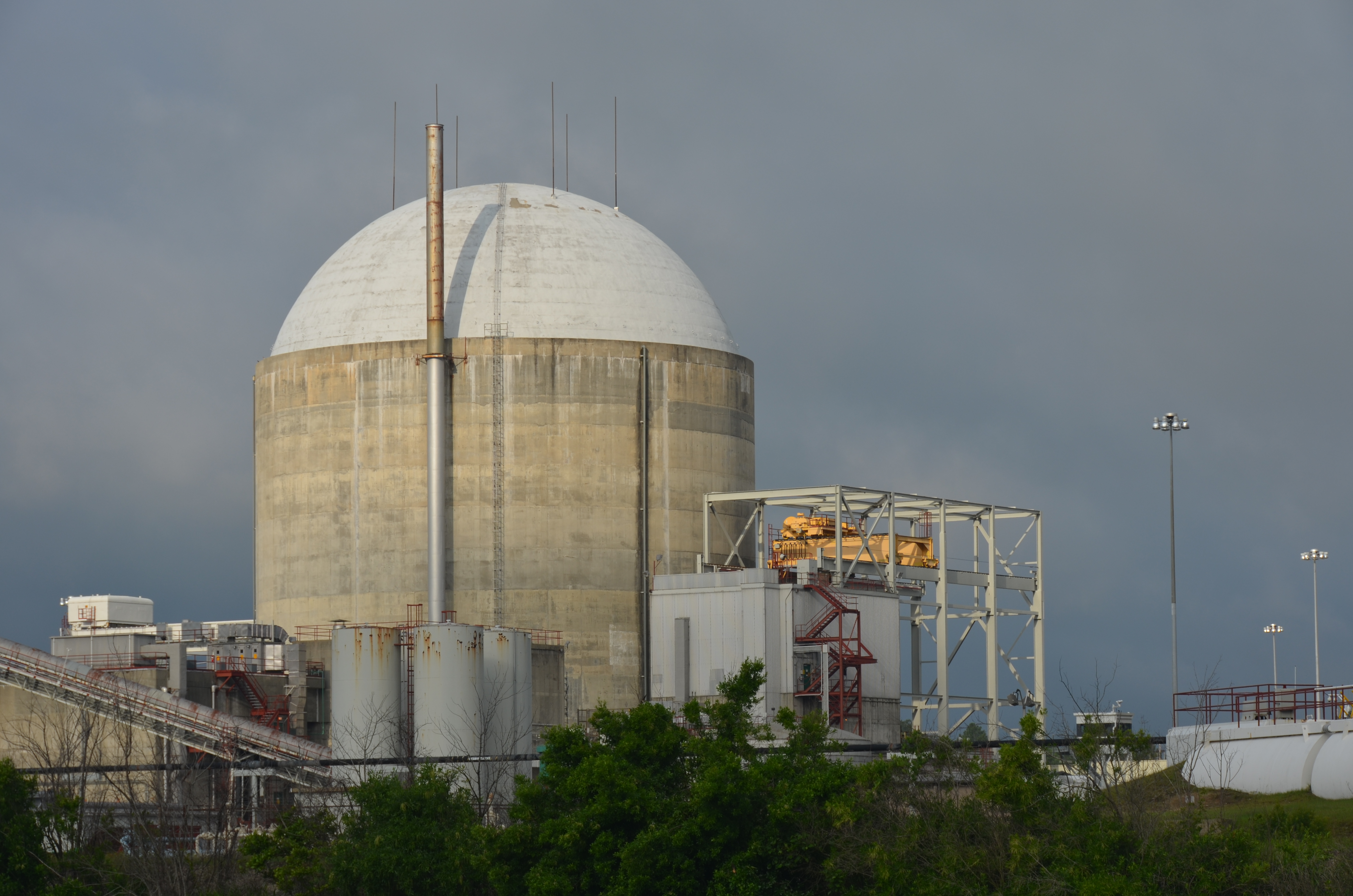
- H.B. Robinson Nuclear Power Station seen from Lake Robinson
- Official name: H.B. Robinson Steam Electric Plant
- Country: United States
- Location: Darlington County, near Hartsville, South Carolina
- Coordinates: 34°24′10″N 80°9′30″W
- Status: Operational
- Construction began: April 13, 1967
- Commission date: March 7, 1971
- Construction cost: $408.5 million (2007 USD)
- Owner: Duke Energy Progress, LLC
- Operator: Duke Energy Progress, LLC

Nuclear power station
- Reactor type: PWR
- Reactor supplier: Westinghouse
- Cooling source: Lake Robinson
- Thermal capacity: 1 × 2339 MW_{th}

Power generation
- Units operational: 1 × 759 MW
- Make and model: WH 3-loop (DRYAMB)
- Nameplate capacity: 759 MW_{e}
- Capacity factor: 98.2% (2019); 78.60% (lifetime)
- Annual net output: 6,426 GWh (2021)

External links
- Website: Robinson Nuclear, a pioneer in nuclear energy
- Commons: Related media on Commons

The H. B. Robinson Steam Electric Plant, also known as Robinson Nuclear Plant, is a nuclear power plant located near Hartsville, South Carolina. The plant consists of one Westinghouse 759 MW pressurized water reactor. The site once included a coal-fired unit that generated 174 MW (which was retired in October 2012 and demolished 2016) and a combustion turbine unit that generated 15 MW.

The Robinson plant is named for H. Burton Robinson, a former executive vice president of Carolina Power & Light. The plant is located adjacent to the 2,250-acre (910 ha) Lake Robinson. The Robinson nuclear unit was the first commercial nuclear power plant in the southeastern United States and was then the largest such in the world.

In April 2026 the plant was cleared to operate for 80 years until 2050.

== Electricity production ==
Generation (MWh) of H.B. Robinson Nuclear Generating Station
Year	Jan	Feb	Mar	Apr	May	Jun	Jul	Aug	Sep	Oct	Nov	Dec	Annual (Total)
2001	540,948	485,156	453,881	71,550	322,819	506,318	520,469	516,173	508,435	534,692	521,411	533,187	5,515,039
2002	524,920	489,299	525,922	513,185	514,973	505,947	515,778	513,572	505,457	174,514	270,465	552,079	5,606,111
2003	558,647	500,860	557,167	533,475	541,560	522,429	535,031	534,703	520,176	547,930	529,668	558,253	6,439,899
2004	558,604	523,102	556,761	335,258	33,302	520,894	535,932	539,049	528,171	510,844	538,888	561,397	5,742,202
2005	561,889	507,489	551,113	538,546	547,235	525,379	535,730	533,878	273,355	90,846	542,777	561,902	5,770,139
2006	562,980	507,683	580,864	524,009	550,676	525,071	538,030	535,996	525,620	507,454	541,935	562,380	6,462,698
2007	560,132	508,107	549,343	92,159	257,258	525,429	525,101	535,744	525,693	550,437	544,248	564,272	5,737,923
2008	564,514	528,053	552,687	541,202	554,155	524,773	538,858	536,268	423,082	-1,964	141,211	524,457	5,427,296
2009	568,589	513,513	566,438	504,260	555,017	526,657	543,523	542,487	530,671	552,952	503,638	565,446	6,473,191
2010	568,020	513,258	507,069	-2,232	-868	-1,364	166,828	537,121	429,803	102,256	207,498	566,507	3,593,896
2011	566,951	510,718	560,001	535,294	545,803	518,213	509,154	513,636	447,962	551,148	542,286	562,637	6,363,803
2012	280,817	-1,415	59,723	549,745	569,928	544,005	541,957	557,355	544,194	577,212	571,922	591,253	5,386,696
2013	592,116	506,497	588,968	533,120	577,147	547,683	562,215	562,450	231,715	-1,857	401,543	593,006	5,694,603
2014	542,167	537,610	129,981	422,027	575,031	544,806	561,389	0	548,378	575,721	566,103	594,249	5,597,462
2015	595,960	538,523	591,128	562,369	204,463	70,596	556,478	556,453	547,677	580,971	329,140	589,964	5,723,722
2016	584,083	555,606	585,606	563,757	561,010	537,521	551,596	415,119	441,462	496,234	549,817	590,377	6,432,188
2017	591,130	452,452	-4,247	392,198	566,109	544,333	555,753	557,543	547,931	569,005	560,667	592,959	5,925,833
2018	595,109	534,231	590,430	562,807	556,891	388,135	548,790	548,396	371,425	-2,024	9,127	572,801	5,276,118
2019	588,734	532,031	587,358	566,783	571,329	552,883	567,974	179,951	494,085	579,093	569,012	587,086	6,376,319
2020	587,243	549,663	585,375	564,645	579,280	558,497	569,631	570,454	555,981	530,420	86,392	387,045	6,124,626
2021	586,010	529,021	581,871	488,087	577,221	553,582	563,384	564,832	551,348	319,452	523,543	588,122	6,426,473
2022	588,962	531,083	586,048	566,098	579,290	550,779	570,102	568,729	432,579	387,298	334,972	-5,915	5,680,025
2023	553,313	531,113	582,021	538,804	580,161	506,633	566,363	565,110	551,844	577,419	558,969	582,624	6,684,374
2024	580,115	544,668	581,487	561,609	575,502	548,472	563,174	568,191	554,238	576,375	72,471	459,004	6,185,306
2025	584,666	523,291	581,539	557,972	573,493	517,615	562,488	556,363	552,785	575,985	559,022	576,170	6,721,389
2026	576,092	519,518	569,498	548,171	561,595	533,515	545,687	546,454					--

== Surrounding population ==
The Nuclear Regulatory Commission defines two emergency planning zones around nuclear power plants: a plume exposure pathway zone with a radius of 10 miles (16 km), concerned primarily with exposure to, and inhalation of, airborne radioactive contamination, and an ingestion pathway zone of about 50 miles (80 km), concerned primarily with ingestion of food and liquid contaminated by radioactivity.

The 2010 U.S. population within 10 miles (16 km) of Robinson was 32,675, an increase of 2.6 percent in a decade, according to an analysis of U.S. Census data for msnbc.com. The 2010 U.S. population within 50 miles (80 km) was 893,536, an increase of 10.3 percent since 2000. Cities within 50 miles include Columbia (49 miles to city center).

== Environmental Impact Statement ==
NUREG-1437, "Generic Environmental Impact Statement for License Renewal of Nuclear Plants," Supplement 13, Regarding H.B. Robinson Steam Electric Plant, Unit No. 2, was published by the Nuclear Regulatory Commission (NRC) in December 2003.

This supplement documents the NRC staff's review of the environmental issues at Robinson, Unit 2 in support of Carolina Power & Light Company's (CP&L) application for license renewal of that facility. The supplement was prepared in accordance with 10 CFR 51.71. This supplemental environmental impact statement includes the staff's analysis that considers and weighs the environmental effects of the proposed action, the environmental impacts of alternatives to the proposed action, and alternatives available for reducing or avoiding adverse impacts. It also includes the staff's recommendation regarding the proposed actions.

== Safety Evaluation Report ==
The NRC staff reviewed the Robinson license renewal application for compliance with the requirements of Title 10 of the Code of Federal Regulations, Part 54, "Requirements for Renewal of Operating Licenses for Nuclear Power Plants," and prepared this report to document its findings. The document was first issued in August 2003, as "Safety Evaluation Report with Open Items Related to the License Renewal of H.B. Robinson, Unit 2". The report is available in ADAMS under accession number ML032370382.

In March 2004, the report "Safety Evaluation Report - Related to the License Renewal of the H. B. Robinson Steam Electric Plant, Unit 2," was issued as NUREG-1785. The report is also available in ADAMS under accession number ML040200981.

== Ownership ==
The operator and owner is Duke Energy Progress, LLC, a wholly owned subsidiary of Duke Energy. Formerly the plant was owned and operated by Progress Energy Inc and Carolina Power & Light.

== Seismic risk ==
The Nuclear Regulatory Commission's estimate of the risk each year of an earthquake intense enough to cause core damage to the reactor at Robinson was 1 in 66,667, according to an NRC study published in August 2010.
