= Thomas E. Hart House =

Historic house in South Carolina, United States

- U.S. National Register of Historic Places
- U.S. Historic district
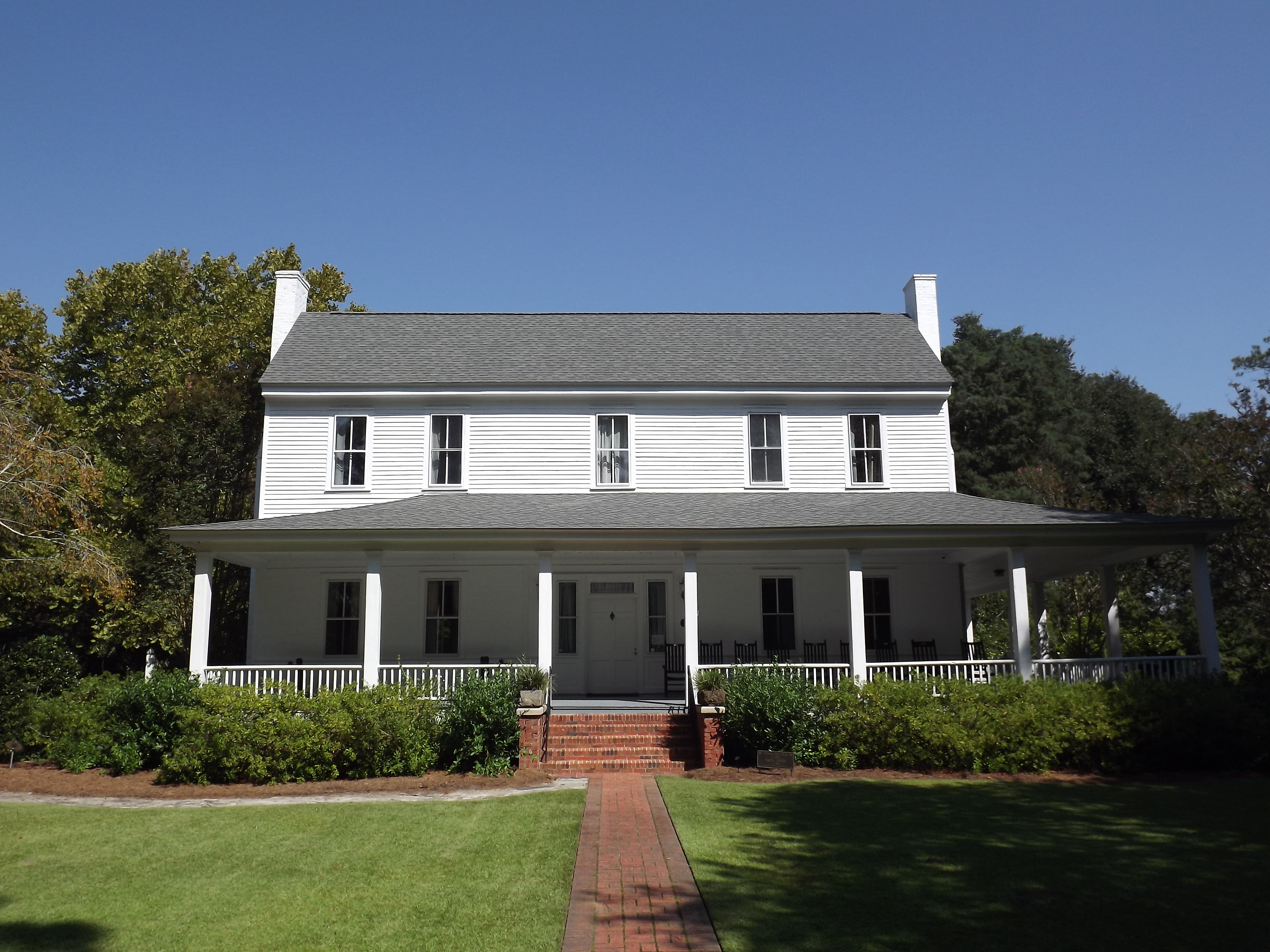

- Location within South Carolina Location within the United States
- Location: 624 W. Carolina Ave., Hartsville, South Carolina
- Coordinates: 34°22′1″N 80°6′57″W
- Area: 30 acres (12 ha)
- Built: 1817
- Architect: Coker, May Roper; Harbison, Thomas G.
- Architectural style: Early Republic, I-House
- MPS: Hartsville MPS
- NRHP reference No.: 91000474
- Added to NRHP: May 3, 1991

The Thomas E. Hart House and Kalmia Gardens is a 30-acre (12 ha) property in Hartsville, South Carolina, that was listed on the U.S. National Register of Historic Places in 1991. The house was built in 1817.
