= Hartsville station =

- Hartsville Passenger Station
- U.S. National Register of Historic Places
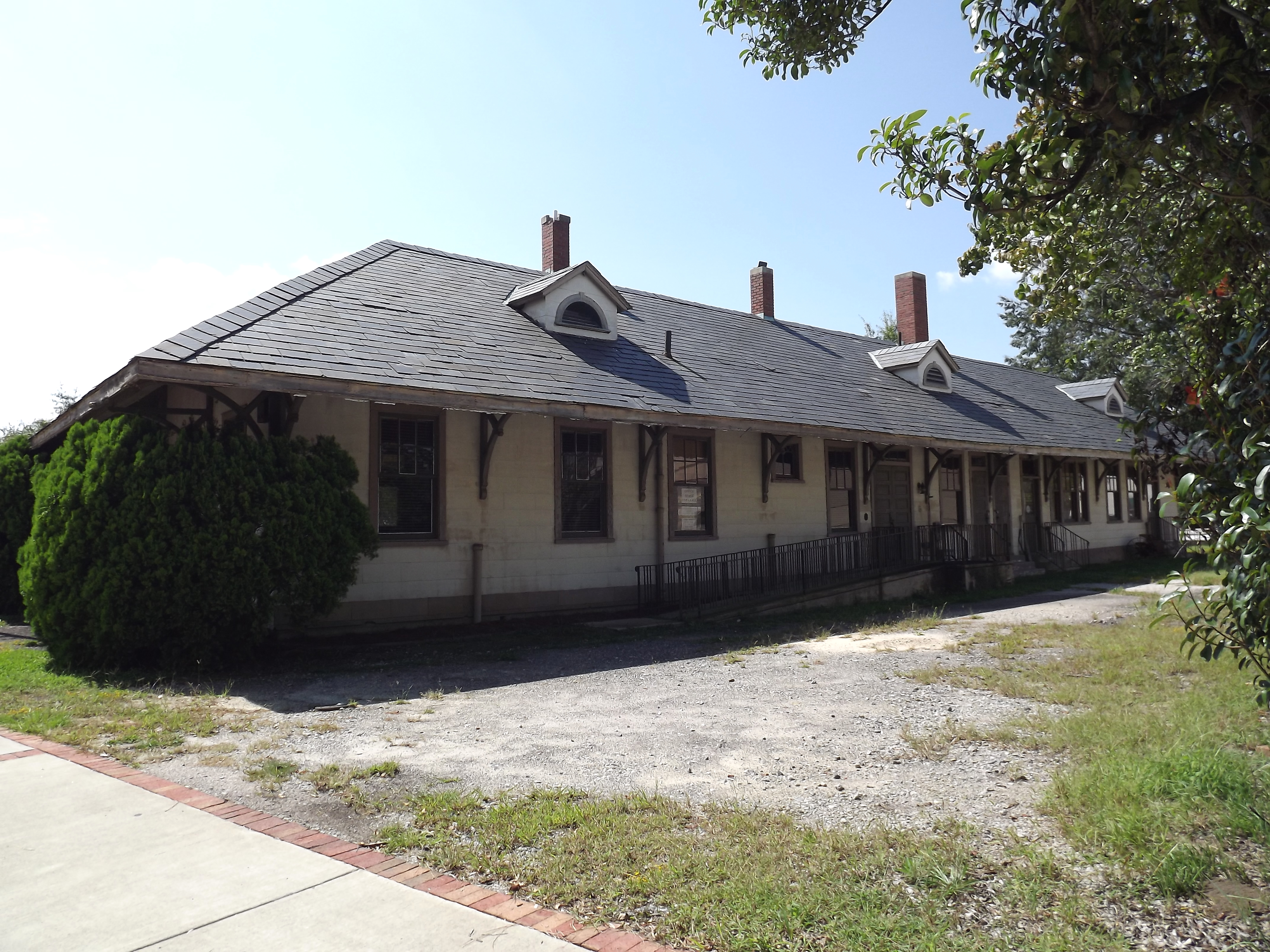
- The Hartsville Passenger Station from Fourth Street

- Location within South Carolina Location within the United States
- Location: 114 S. 4th St., Hartsville, South Carolina
- Coordinates: 34°22′23.9988″N 80°4′26.000″W
- Area: 0.5 acres (0.20 ha)
- Built: 1908
- NRHP reference No.: 76001700
- Added to NRHP: June 29, 1976

Hartsville station, also known as the Hartsville Depot, is a historic train station located at Hartsville, Darlington County, South Carolina. It was built in 1908 by the Atlantic Coast Line Railroad, and is a one-story structure typical of early 20th century railroad design. It has a hipped slate roof with a deep overhang supported by large wooden brackets. The Atlantic Coast Line discontinued this line to Hartsville in 1940, and in 1948 the station became the office for the Chairman of the Board of Directors of the Atlantic Coast Line Railroad Company.

It was listed on the National Register of Historic Places in 1976.

Preceding station	Atlantic Coast Line Railroad	Following station
Terminus	Hartsville – Florence	Auburn toward Florence
