= Paul H. Rogers House =

Historic house in South Carolina, United States

- U.S. National Register of Historic Places
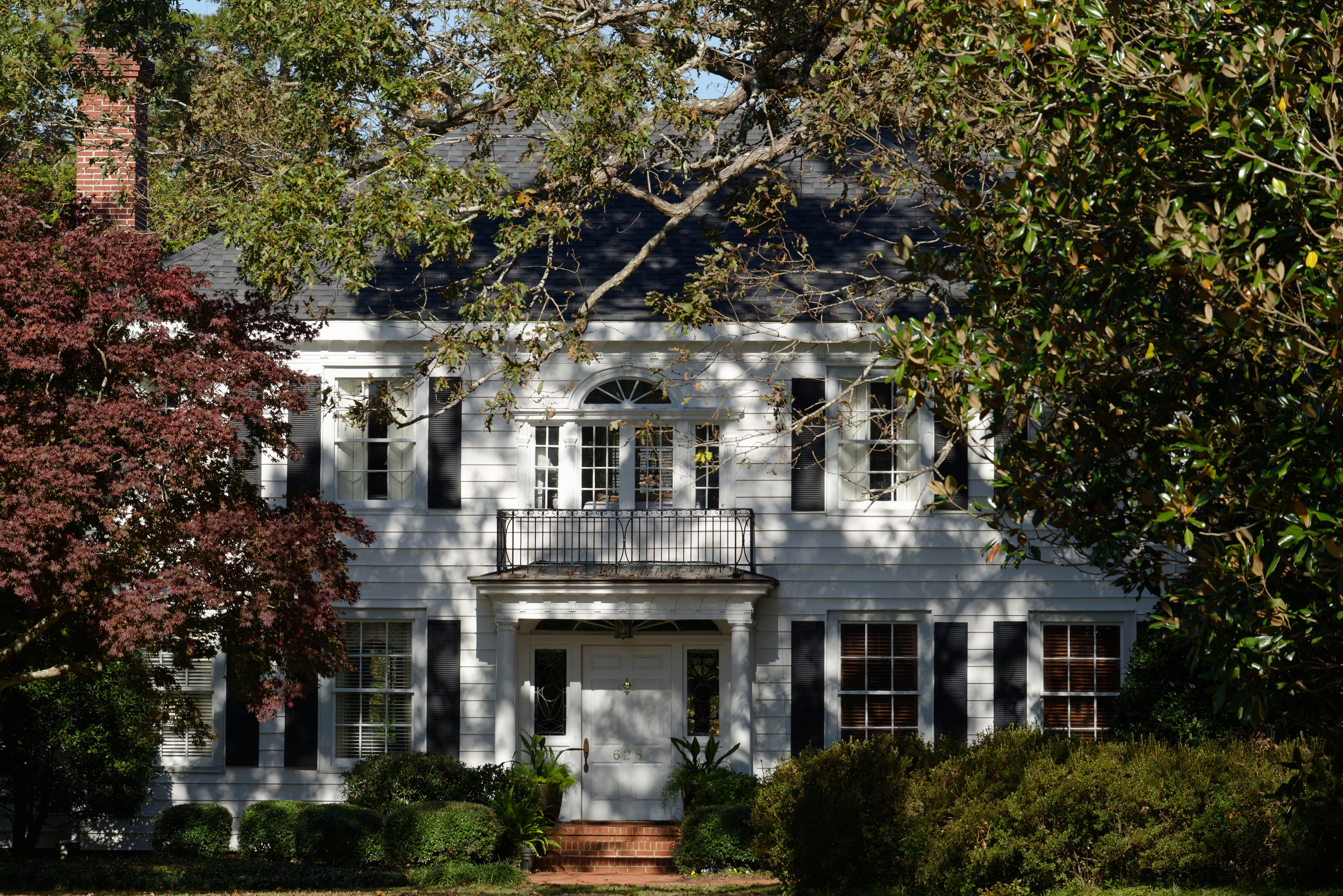

- Location within South Carolina Location within the United States
- Location: 628 W. Home Ave., Hartsville, South Carolina
- Coordinates: 34°22′17″N 80°5′22″W
- Area: 1.3 acres (0.53 ha)
- Built: 1927
- Architect: Gordon, Franklin
- Architectural style: Colonial Revival
- MPS: Hartsville MPS
- NRHP reference No.: 94001125
- Added to NRHP: September 8, 1994

Paul H. Rogers House is a historic home located at Hartsville, Darlington County, South Carolina. It was built in 1927, and is a two-story, five-bay, rectangular frame Colonial Revival style residence. It has a hipped roof. The front facade features an iron balustraded balcony supported by two Tuscan order columns. The second story features a four-part Palladian window above the balcony. It was the home of Paul. H. Rogers (1883-1960), prominent Hartsville industrialist and businessman who served as president of Carolina Fiber Company and as mayor of Hartsville.

It was listed on the National Register of Historic Places in 1994.
