= S. Pressly Coker House =

Historic house in South Carolina, United States

- U.S. National Register of Historic Places
- Location within South Carolina Location within the United States
- Location: 402 W. Home Ave., Hartsville, South Carolina
- Coordinates: 34°22′16″N 80°4′52″W
- Area: 2 acres (0.81 ha)
- Built: 1917
- Architect: Casey, Joseph Huntley; Fant, Charles William
- Architectural style: Bungalow/craftsman
- MPS: Hartsville MPS
- NRHP reference No.: 94001131
- Added to NRHP: September 8, 1994

S. Pressly Coker House is a historic home located at Hartsville, Darlington County, South Carolina. It was built in 1917, it is a blending of elements of both the Shingle Style and Colonial Revival styles, with the form and massing of the bungalow. It is a two-story, three-bay, rectangular, shingle-clad residence. It features an engaged one-story portico which extends and wraps to form a porte-cochère. It was the home of S. Pressly Coker (1887-1953), prominent Hartsville agriculturalist and businessman who was a plant breeder with the Coker Pedigreed Seed Company and later founder and president of the Humphrey-Coker Seed Company and the Hygeia Dairy.

It was listed on the National Register of Historic Places in 1994.
