= Center Theater (Hartsville, South Carolina) =

- U.S. National Register of Historic Places
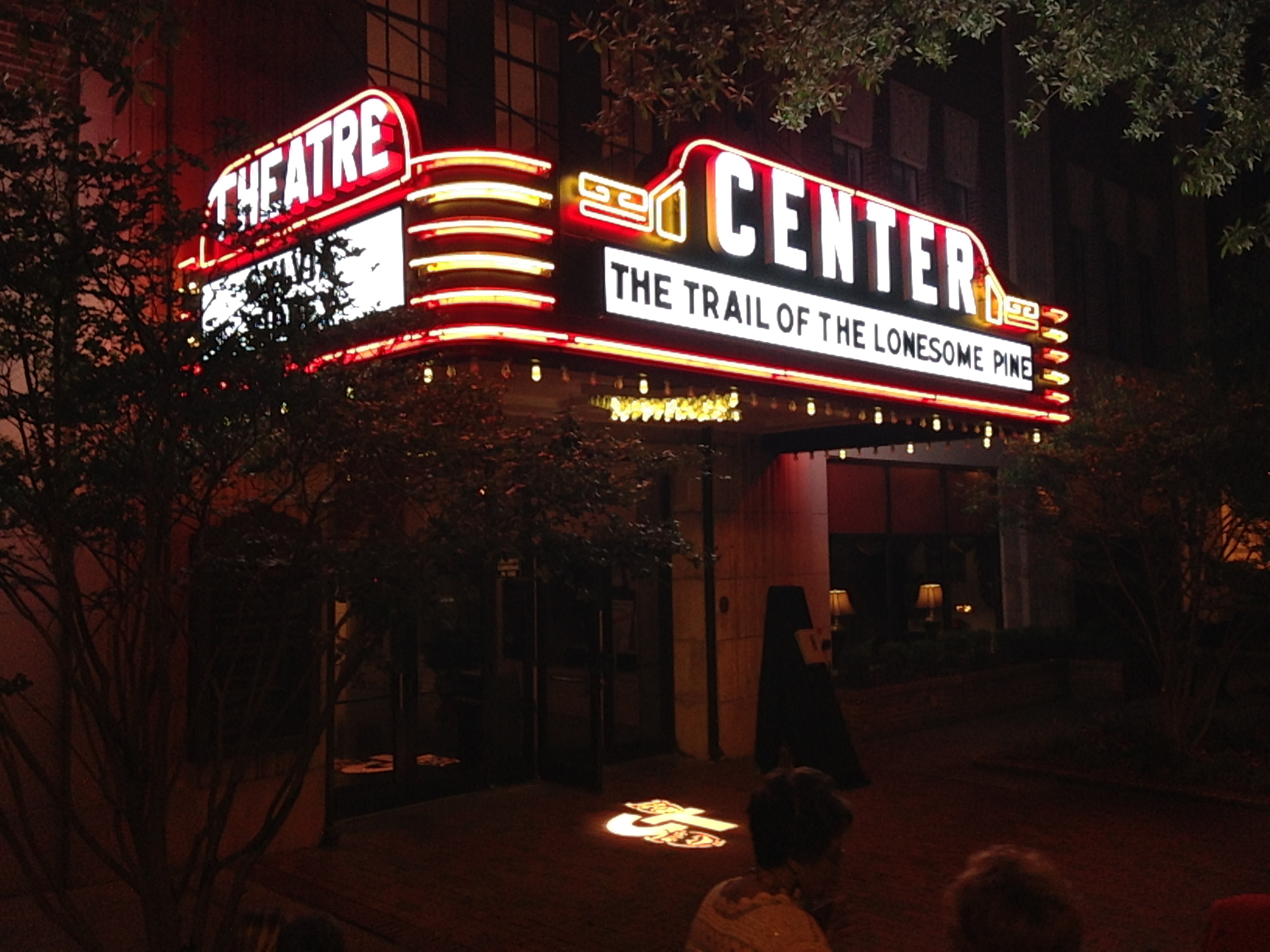
- The Center Theater, c. 2012

- Location within South Carolina
- Location: Hartsville, South Carolina
- Coordinates: 34°22′32.64″N 80°4′27.04″W
- Built: 1936
- Architect: Lafaye & Lafaye
- Architectural style: Art Deco
- NRHP reference No.: 97000538
- Added to NRHP: June 4, 1997

The Center Theater in Hartsville, South Carolina is a theater located at 212 N Fifth St. The theater was built in 1936 using money from the federal Works Progress Administration, a component of Franklin Delano Roosevelt's New Deal agency. The theater contains 867 seats, almost 200 of which are in the balcony. The building has historically been known as "Building A" or the "Community Center Theater", as it was constructed as part of a project including two other buildings on the block. Initially used as a motion picture theater, the facility was later modified to accommodate performance arts. Center Theater has hosted several famous artists, including Loretta Lynn (twice) and Johnny Cash.
