= East Home Avenue Historic District =

Historic district in South Carolina, United States

- U.S. National Register of Historic Places
- U.S. Historic district
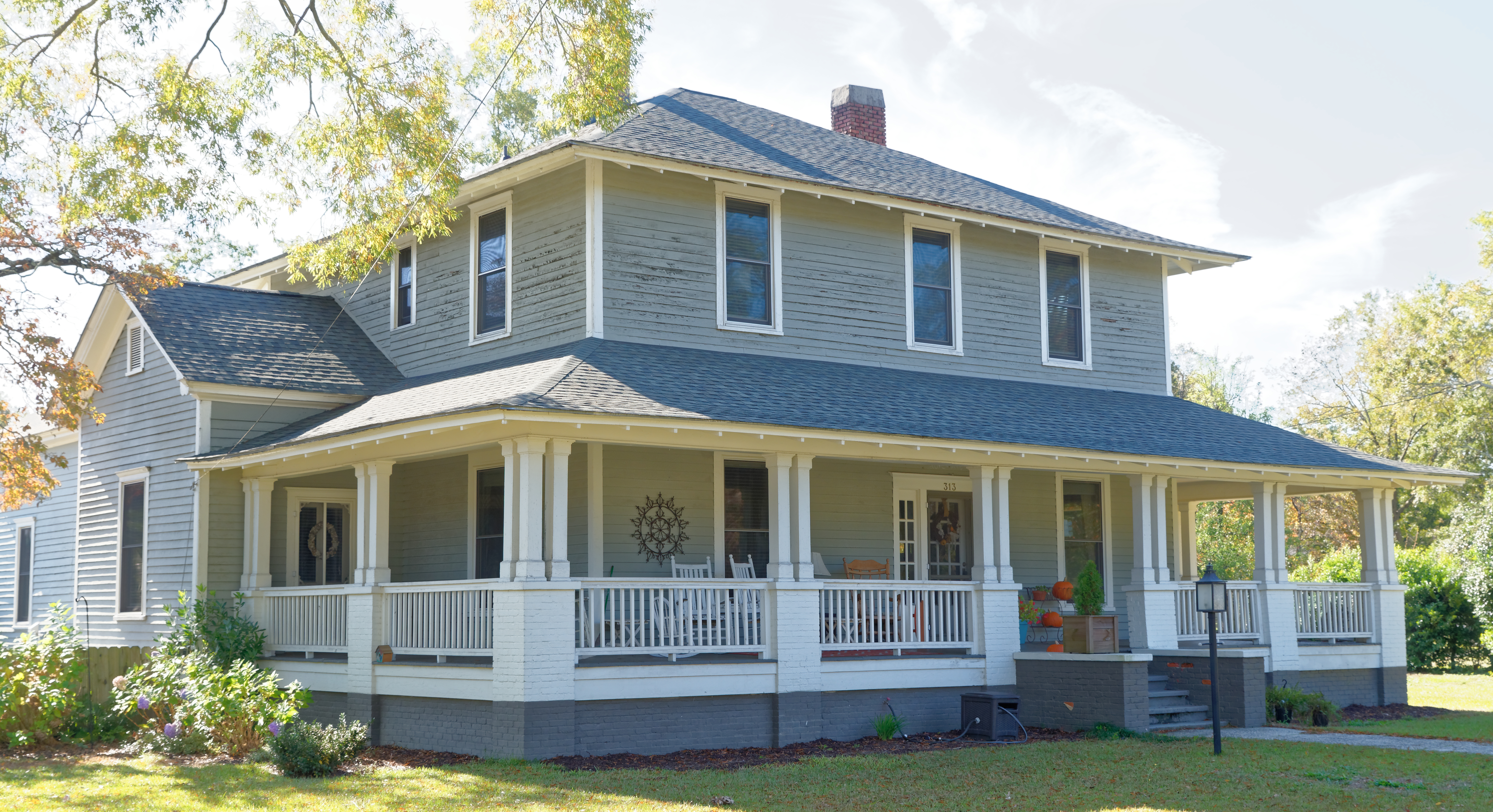
- Wade Hampton Hicks house

- Location within South Carolina Location within the United States
- Location: Roughly, E. Home Ave. from N. Fifth St. to just E of First Ave., Hartsville, South Carolina
- Coordinates: 34°22′45″N 80°04′14″W
- Area: 44.3 acres (17.9 ha)
- Built: 1890
- Architect: Wilson, Charles Coker; Johnson, J. Carroll
- Architectural style: Colonial Revival, Classical Revival, Renaissance
- MPS: Hartsville MPS
- NRHP reference No.: 91000475
- Added to NRHP: May 3, 1991

East Home Avenue Historic District is a national historic district located at Hartsville, Darlington County, South Carolina. The district encompasses 52 contributing buildings and 1 contributing site in a primarily residential section of Hartsville. They were constructed between about 1890 to about 1938, and is associated with the leading figures of the town's history. Home Avenue has historically been the major residential street in Hartsville since it was laid out and landscaped in 1890. Architectural styles and influences include Renaissance Revival, Colonial Revival, Classical Revival, American Craftsman, and Bungalow. Notable non-residential buildings include the First Baptist Church, Thornwell Elementary School, and Hartsville Public School. Located in the district is the separately listed John L. Hart House.

It was listed on the National Register of Historic Places in 1991.
