= C.K. Dunlap House =

Historic house in South Carolina, United States

- C. K. Dunlap House
- U.S. National Register of Historic Places
- Location within South Carolina Location within the United States
- Location: 1346 W. Carolina Ave., Hartsville, South Carolina
- Coordinates: 34°22′32″N 80°6′30″W
- Area: 3.2 acres (1.3 ha)
- Built: 1934
- Architect: Irvin, Willis
- Architectural style: Colonial Revival
- MPS: Hartsville MPS
- NRHP reference No.: 91000472
- Added to NRHP: May 3, 1991

The C. K. Dunlap House is a historic house located at 1346 West Carolina Avenue in Hartsville, Darlington County, South Carolina.

== Description and history ==
The house, built in 1934 and designed by Willis Irvin, is a two-story, five bay wide, rectangular brick Colonial Revival style residence. The façade features a two-story pedimented portico with balcony tier and four square columns. It was the home of Charles Kirkland Dunlap (1886–1972), prominent Hartsville engineer and executive at Sonoco Products Company.

It was listed on the National Register of Historic Places on May 3, 1991.
