= A.M. McNair House =

Historic house in South Carolina, United States

- A. M. McNair House
- U.S. National Register of Historic Places
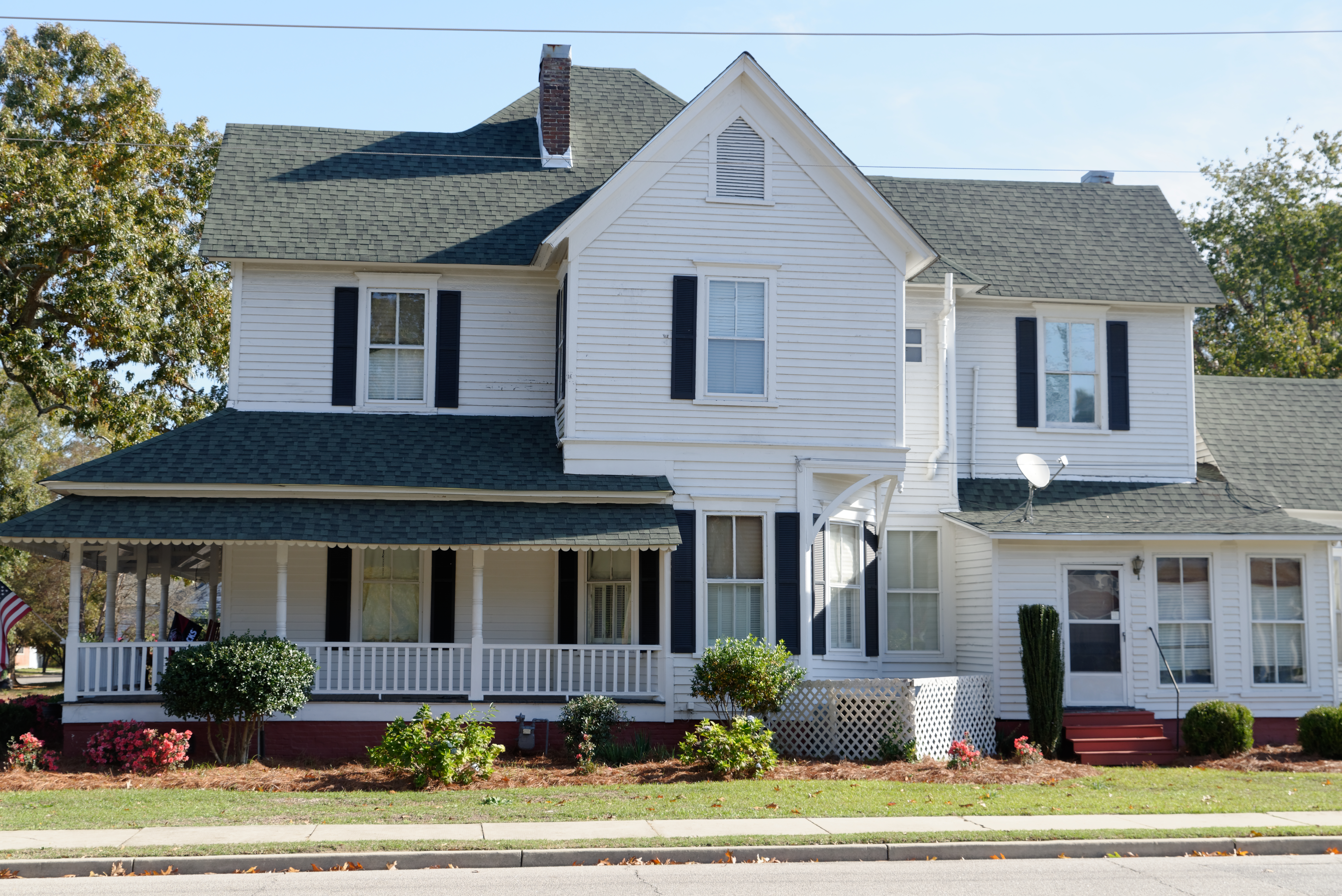

- Location within South Carolina Location within the United States
- Location: 153 W. Home Ave., Hartsville, South Carolina
- Coordinates: 34°22′31″N 80°4′35″W
- Area: less than one acre
- Built: 1902
- Architectural style: Late Victorian
- MPS: Hartsville MPS
- NRHP reference No.: 94001126
- Added to NRHP: September 8, 1994

A. M. McNair House is a historic home located at Hartsville, Darlington County, South Carolina. It was built in 1902, and is a two-story, three-bay, Late Victorian style frame residence on a brick foundation. It has an asymmetrical plan and a pyramidal roof with cross gables. It features a one-story, hip roof wraparound porch and a two-story gabled bay extension where the wraparound porch terminates. It was the home of A.M. McNair (1857–1929), prominent Hartsville businessman who served as co-owner of McKinnon and McNair Department Store, founder and president of the Pee Dee Furniture Company, and vice president of the Bank of Hartsville.

It was listed on the National Register of Historic Places in 1994.
