= West College Avenue Historic District =

Historic district in South Carolina, United States

- U.S. National Register of Historic Places
- U.S. Historic district
- Location within South Carolina Location within the United States
- Location: W. College Ave. from Sixth Ave. to W of Eighth Ave., Hartsville, South Carolina
- Coordinates: 34°22′24″N 80°04′43″W
- Area: 13 acres (5.3 ha)
- Architectural style: Late 19th And 20th Century Revivals, Late 19th And Early 20th Century American Movements
- MPS: Hartsville MPS
- NRHP reference No.: 94001123
- Added to NRHP: September 8, 1994

West College Avenue Historic District is a national historic district located at Hartsville, Darlington County, South Carolina. The district encompasses 22 contributing buildings in a primarily residential section of Hartsville. They were constructed between about 1906 to about 1930, with the majority constructed between 1910 and 1926. They illustrate a period of significant development which saw the town's population increase more than five times its size at the turn of the 20th century. The architecture reflects late-19th and early-20th century movements such as Victorian, Queen Anne, Colonial Revival, and Bungalow.

It was listed on the National Register of Historic Places in 1994.
