= Magnolia Cemetery (Hartsville, South Carolina) =

Cemetery in Hartsville, South Carolina, US

- U.S. National Register of Historic Places
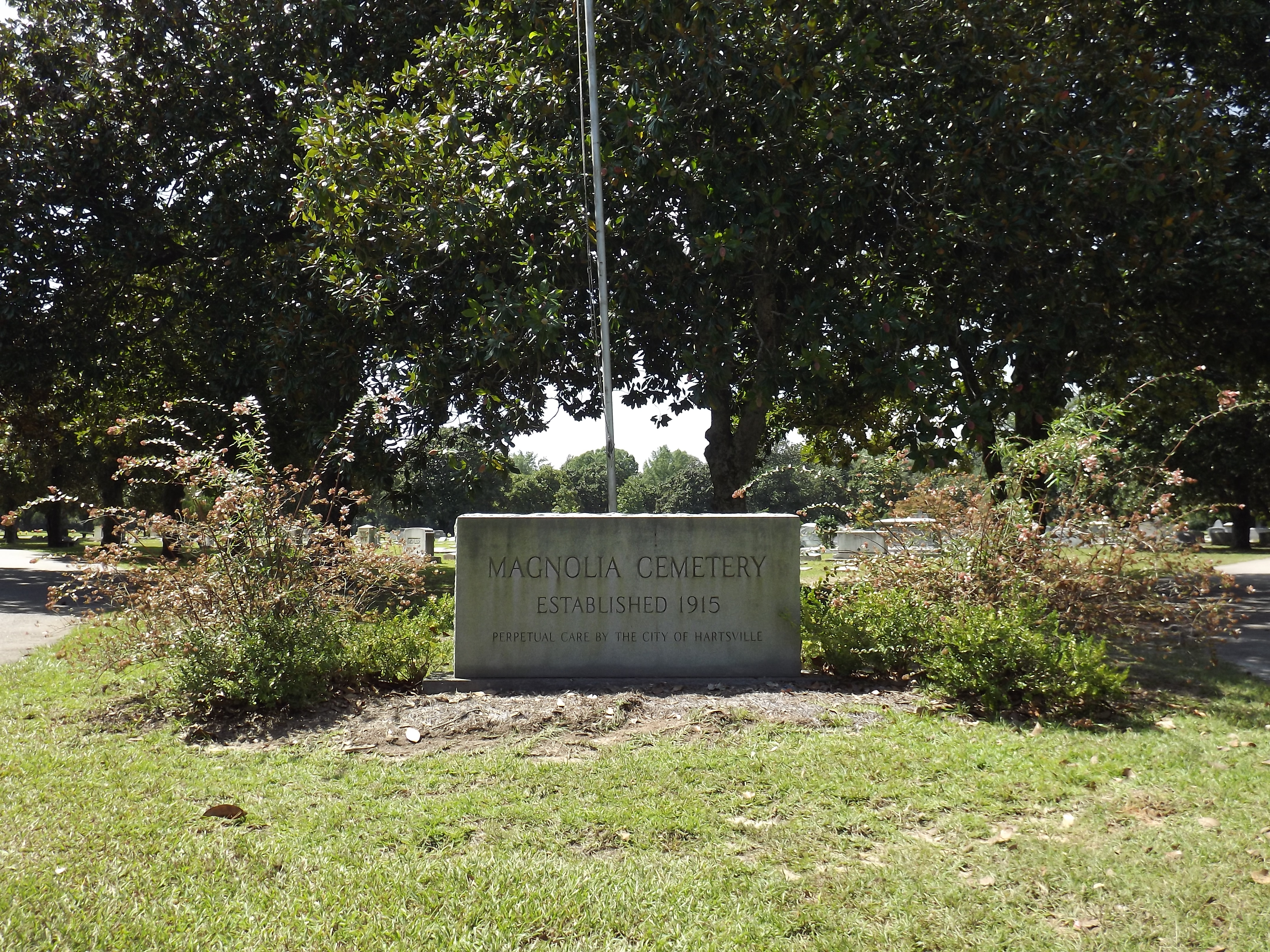

- Location within South Carolina Location within the United States
- Location: S. Cedar Ln., Hartsville, South Carolina
- Coordinates: 34°21′52″N 80°5′28″W
- Area: 15 acres (6.1 ha)
- Built: 1917
- Architect: T. E. Wilson, Walker DuBose Woods
- MPS: Hartsville MPS
- NRHP reference No.: 94001133
- Added to NRHP: September 08, 1994

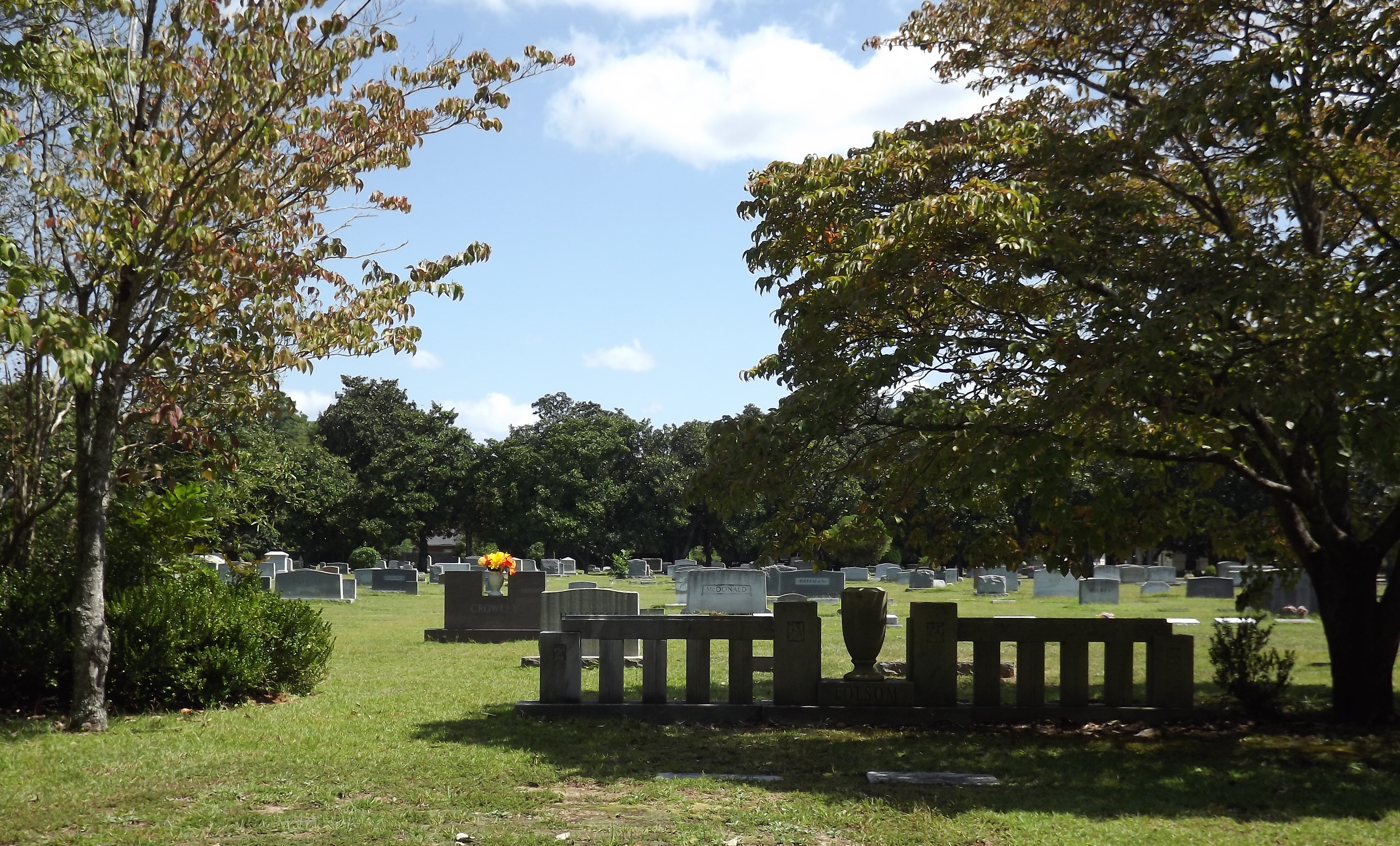
A view toward the east.

Magnolia Cemetery is a historic cemetery located at Hartsville, Darlington County, South Carolina. It was established in 1917, and is a 23-acre cemetery characterized by narrow and gently curving streets and by landscaping which includes an avenue of cedars lining the entrance drive and magnolias lining the streets which form the historic core of the cemetery. The historic portion, approximately 14.5 acres, includes approximately 2,000 graves dating from about 1920 to the mid-20th century.

It was named to the National Register of Historic Places in 1994.

== Notable interments ==
- Louis Norman "Bobo" Newsom (1907–1962), Major League Baseball Player
