= Hartsville Post Office =

Historic post office in South Carolina, US

- U.S. National Register of Historic Places
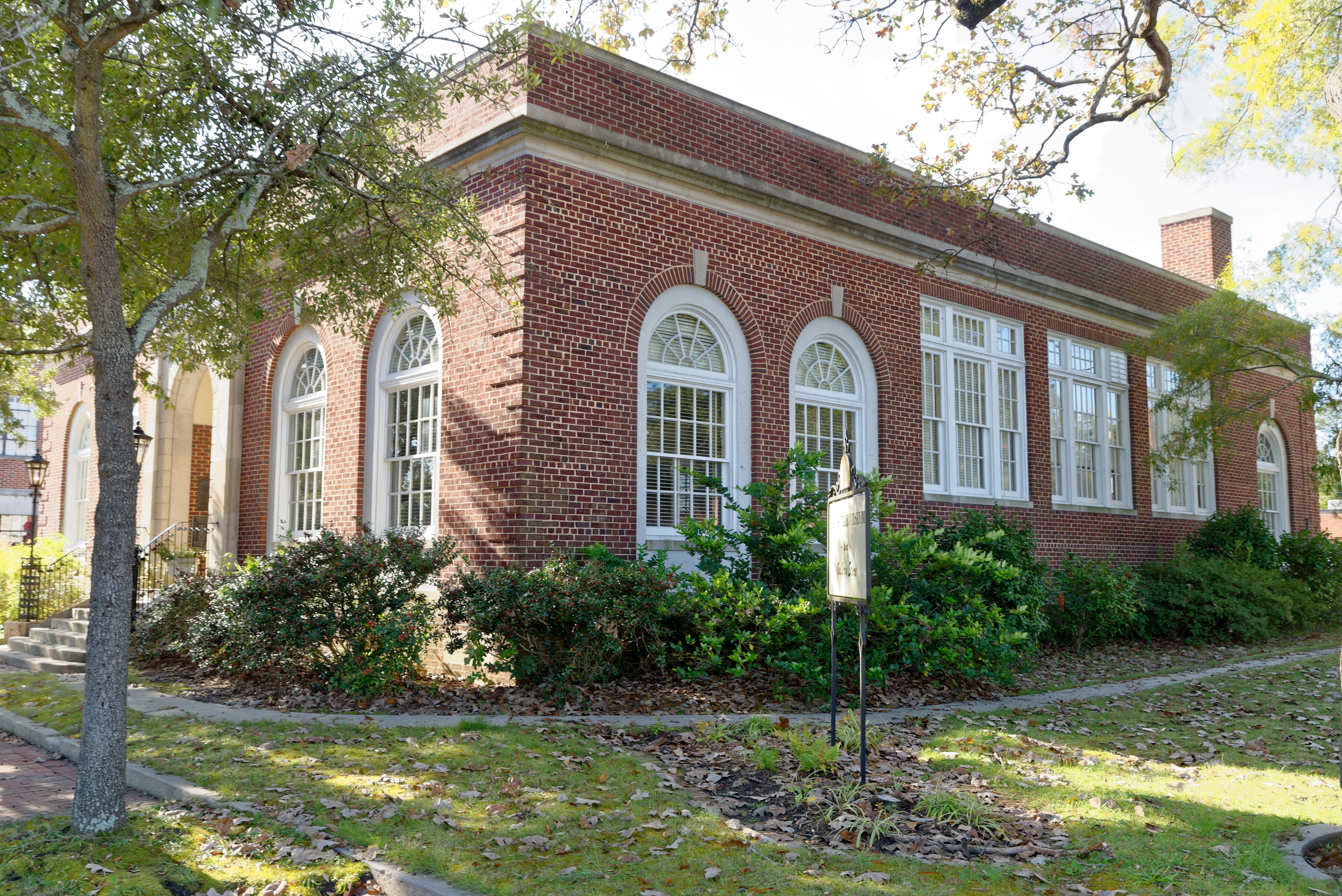

- Location within South Carolina Location within the United States
- Location: Jct. of Home Ave. and Fifth St., Hartsville, South Carolina
- Coordinates: 34°22′33″N 80°4′29″W
- Area: less than one acre
- Built: 1930
- Built by: Jones and Company
- Architect: Ernest C. Steward; James A. Wetmore (supervising architect)
- Architectural style: Colonial Revival
- MPS: Hartsville MPS
- NRHP reference No.: 97000537
- Added to NRHP: June 4, 1997

Hartsville Post Office, which later became the Hartsville Memorial Library and is currently the home of the Hartsville Museum, is a historic post office building located at 222 N. Fifth Street in Hartsville, Darlington County, South Carolina. It was built in 1930, and by the Office of the Supervising Architect, United States Department of the Treasury under James A. Wetmore. Ernest C. Steward, a Treasury department engineer, supervised on-site during the construction. It is a one-story, five-bay, brick Colonial Revival style building. It has a rectangular plan and flat roof with parapet. The symmetrical façade features large arched window openings with decorative keystones. This building served as Hartsville's post office until 1963, when a new post office was built. Then it served as the town library until 1994, when a new library was built.

It was listed on the National Register of Historic Places in 1997.

The building is now home to the Hartsville Museum, which offers local history and art exhibits.
