= Lawton Park and Pavilion =

- U.S. National Register of Historic Places
- U.S. Historic district
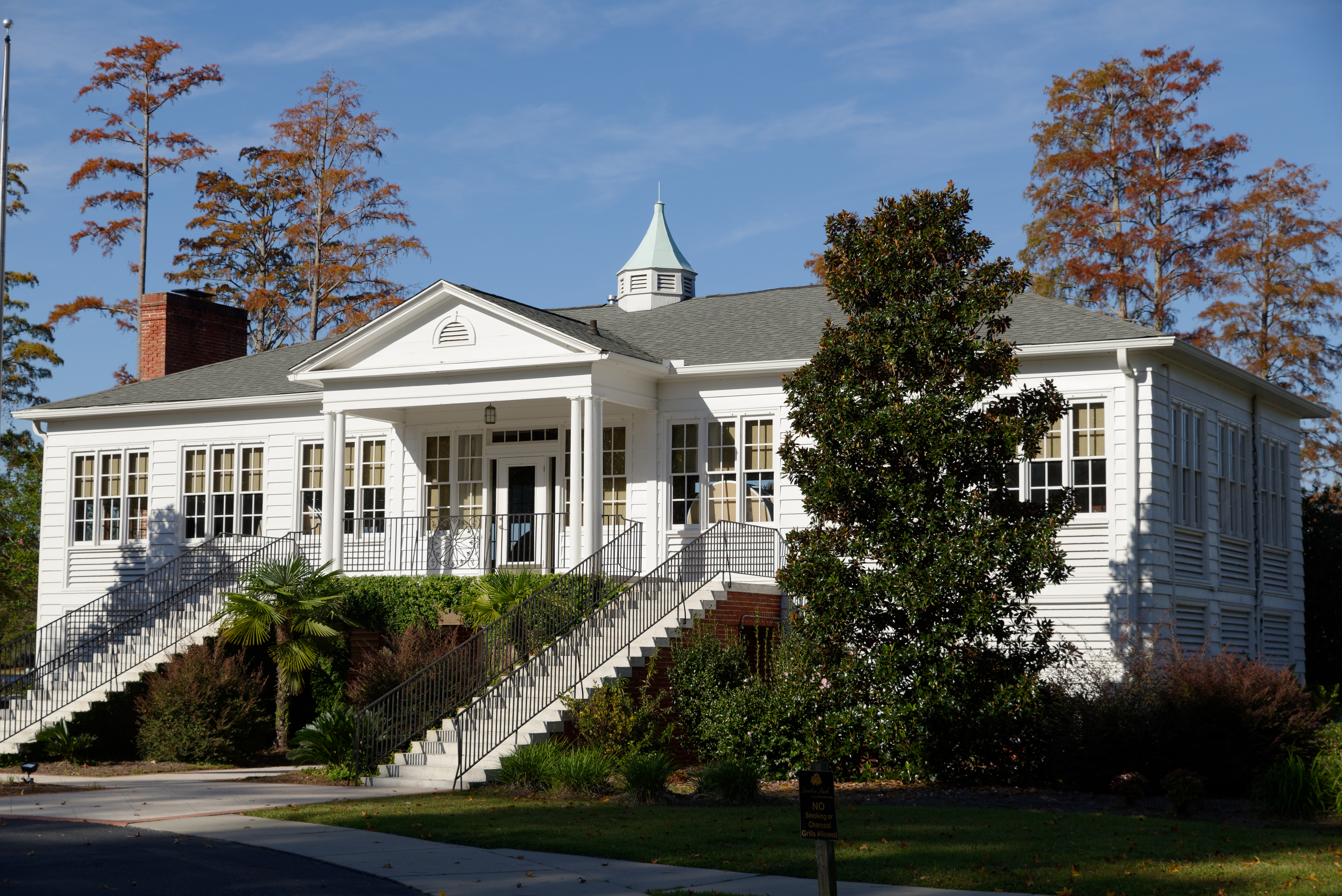
- The pavilion

- Location within South Carolina Location within the United States
- Location: Prestwood Dr. at jct. with Lanier Dr., Hartsville, South Carolina
- Coordinates: 34°22′55″N 80°4′48″W
- Area: 3.5 acres (1.4 ha)
- Built: 1941
- Architect: Works Progress Administration
- Architectural style: Colonial Revival
- MPS: Hartsville MPS
- NRHP reference No.: 91000476
- Added to NRHP: May 3, 1991

Lawton Park and Pavilion is a historic public park and national historic district located at Hartsville, Darlington County, South Carolina. The district encompasses two contributing buildings built 1939-1941 by the Works Progress Administration, and planned as early as 1938. The park is a wooded, 3.5 acre, public recreation area including a swimming area, playground, picnic area, and tennis courts. The park includes three buildings: a Colonial Revival style pavilion, shed and keeper's house.

It was listed on the National Register of Historic Places in 1991.
