= James L. Coker III House =

Historic house in South Carolina, United States

- U.S. National Register of Historic Places
- Location within South Carolina Location within the United States
- Location: 620 W. Home Ave., Hartsville, South Carolina
- Coordinates: 34°22′18″N 80°5′20″W
- Area: 2.8 acres (1.1 ha)
- Built: 1931
- Architect: Irvin, Willis
- Architectural style: Colonial Revival
- MPS: Hartsville MPS
- NRHP reference No.: 91000471
- Added to NRHP: May 3, 1991

James L. Coker III House is a historic home located at Hartsville, Darlington County, South Carolina. It was built in 1931, and is a two-story, three-bay, brick Colonial Revival style residence. It has two-story, lateral gable wings flanked by one-story end gable wings, and a one-story sunroom. It features an engaged portico with four slender Tuscan order columns. It was the home of James Lide Coker, III (1904-1961), prominent Hartsville manufacturer and president of Sonoco Products Company. Also on the property is a one-story, frame, double-pen "cabin".

It was listed on the National Register of Historic Places in 1991.
