= E. W. Cannon House and Store =

Historic house in South Carolina, United States

- W. E. Cannon House and Store
- U.S. National Register of Historic Places
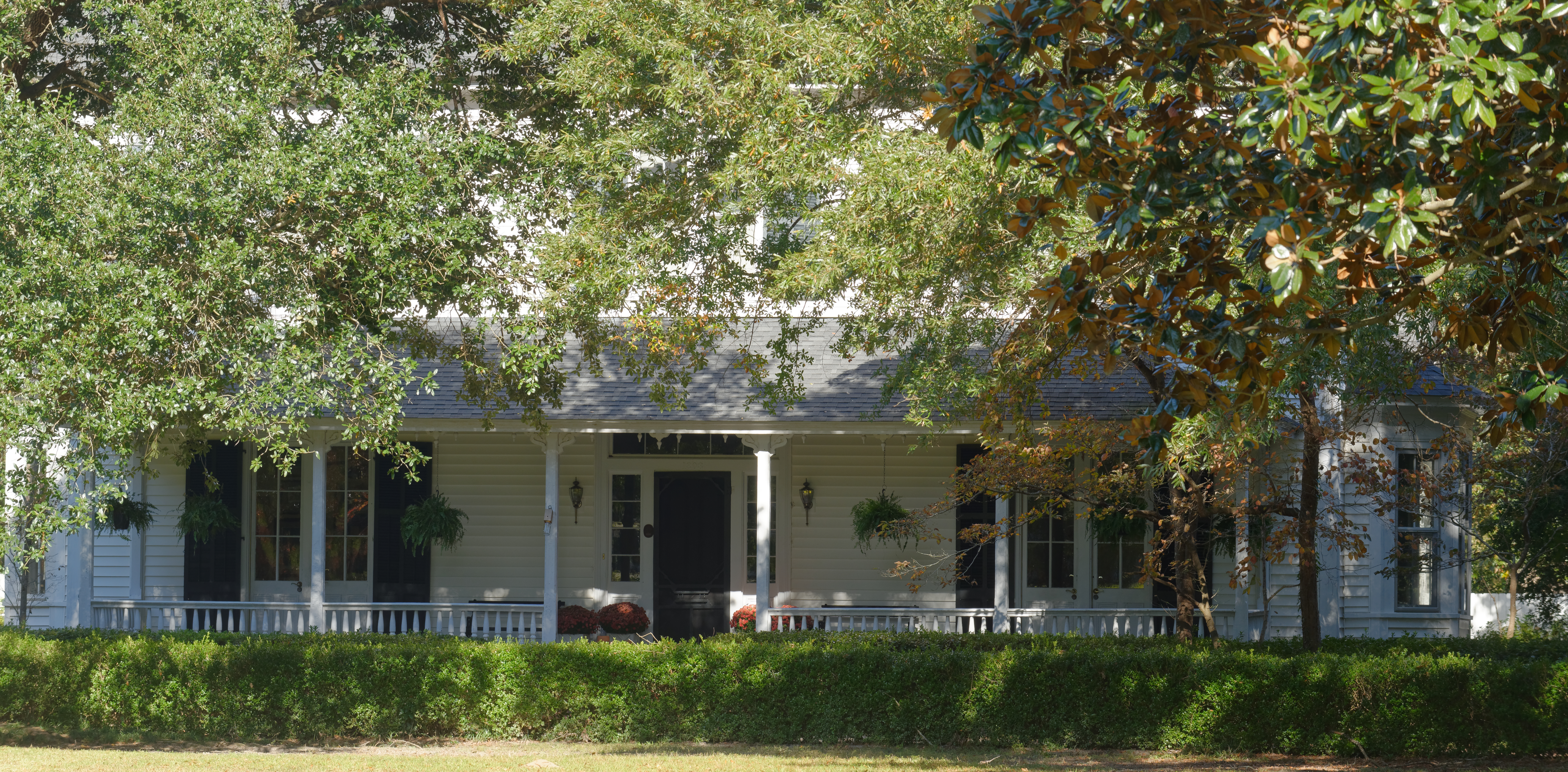

- Location within South Carolina Location within the United States
- Location: 612 W. Home Ave., Hartsville, South Carolina
- Coordinates: 34°22′19″N 80°5′18″W
- Area: 2.8 acres (1.1 ha)
- Built: c. 1840, c. 1870, c. 1880
- Architectural style: Mid-19th Century
- MPS: Hartsville MPS
- NRHP reference No.: 91000470
- Added to NRHP: May 3, 1991

E. W. Cannon House and Store is a historic home and general store located at Hartsville, Darlington County, South Carolina. The main house was built about 1880 and incorporates a small one-story residence built about 1840 that now serves as a rear wing. It is a two-story, rectangular, frame residence with weatherboard siding. It features a one-story hip roof porch that extends across the full façade. The store was built about 1870 and is located to the rear of the house. It is a 1 1/2-story, rectangular, hand-hewn heavy timber-frame building that served as a post office from 1873 to 1878. Also on the property are a contributing frame garage (c. 1930) and a frame smokehouse (c. 1880–1900). The house and store were built by Elihu W. Cannon (1841-1911), prominent Hartsville farmer, postmaster, and Darlington County politician.

It was listed on the National Register of Historic Places in 1991.
