= Wade Hampton Hicks House =

Historic house in South Carolina, United States

- U.S. National Register of Historic Places
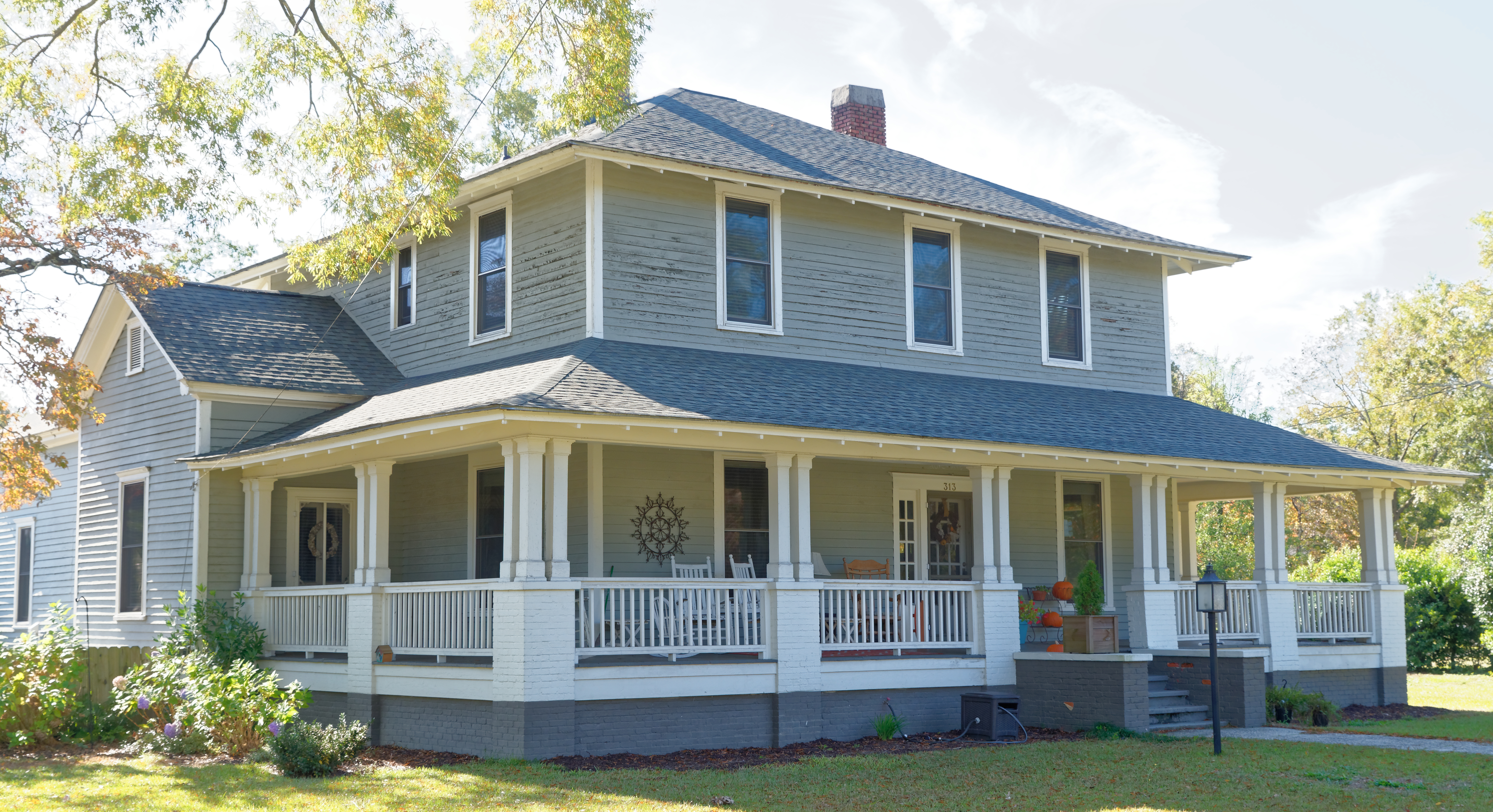

- Location within South Carolina Location within the United States
- Location: 313 W. Home Ave., Hartsville, South Carolina
- Coordinates: 34°22′26″N 80°4′47″W
- Area: less than one acre
- Built: c. 1901, 1919
- Architectural style: Bungalow/craftsman
- MPS: Hartsville MPS
- NRHP reference No.: 94001127
- Added to NRHP: September 8, 1994

Wade Hampton Hicks House is a historic home located at Hartsville, Darlington County, South Carolina. It was built in 1901, and expanded with a second story in 1919. It is a two-story, three-bay, rectangular American Craftsman inspired residence, set upon a brick foundation. It has a hipped roof with wide overhangs and exposed rafter tails and a one-story hipped roof wraparound porch. Also on the property is a small wooden carriage house/smokehouse, constructed about 1901. It was the home of Wade Hampton Hicks (1874-1945), prominent Hartsville farmer and businessman who founded W.H. Hicks and Son Feed and Seed Company.

It was listed on the National Register of Historic Places in 1994.
