= Coker Experimental Farms =

- U.S. National Register of Historic Places
- U.S. National Historic Landmark
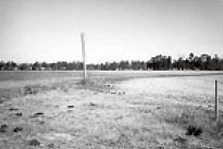
- Coker Experimental Farms

- Location within South Carolina Location within the United States
- Nearest city: Hartsville, South Carolina
- Coordinates: 34°21′47″N 80°3′35″W
- Area: 145 acres (59 ha)
- Built: 1902
- NRHP reference No.: 66000706

Significant dates
- Added to NRHP: October 15, 1966
- Designated NHL: July 19, 1964

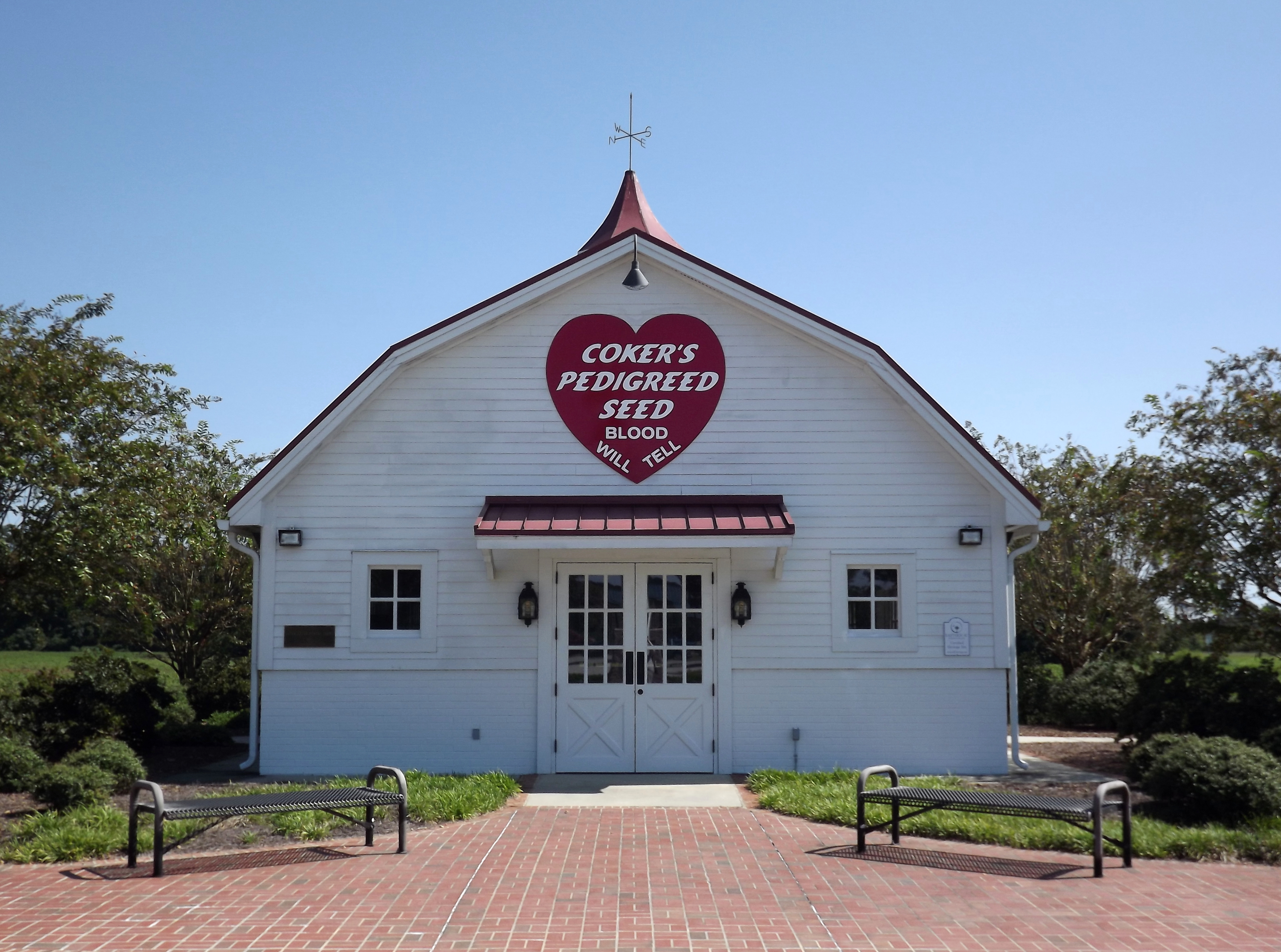
The interpretive center at the Coker Experimental Farms site.

Coker Experimental Farms, also known as Coker Pedigreed Seed Company, is a National Historic Landmark agricultural site at 1257 South Fourth Street in Hartsville, South Carolina, USA. The property, which is now owned by a museum, was the location where David R. Coker conducted crucial breeding experiments to enhance the strains of cotton and other crops cultivated in the southern United States. Coker was a major force in the development of agricultural extension services in the South in the early decades of the 20th century. What remains of his farm was declared a National Historic Landmark in 1964.

== Description and history ==
=== Historic use ===
The Coker family once owned thousands of acres of agricultural lands in the area around Hartsville, South Carolina. At their main station south of the city, David R. Coker began to apply techniques in plant hybridization discovered by Gregor Mendel in the 1860s and only brought to wider notice around the turn of the 20th century. His first experiments involved attempts to breed cotton with a longer staple, and to improve resistance to disease and pests. Coker eventually broadened his work to other crops, and was a major force in improving the education of farmers in the American South through the use of agricultural extension services. By 1963, more than half the cotton grown in the South was derived from Coker seeds, as were larger percentages of oat and tobacco crops.

=== Development ===
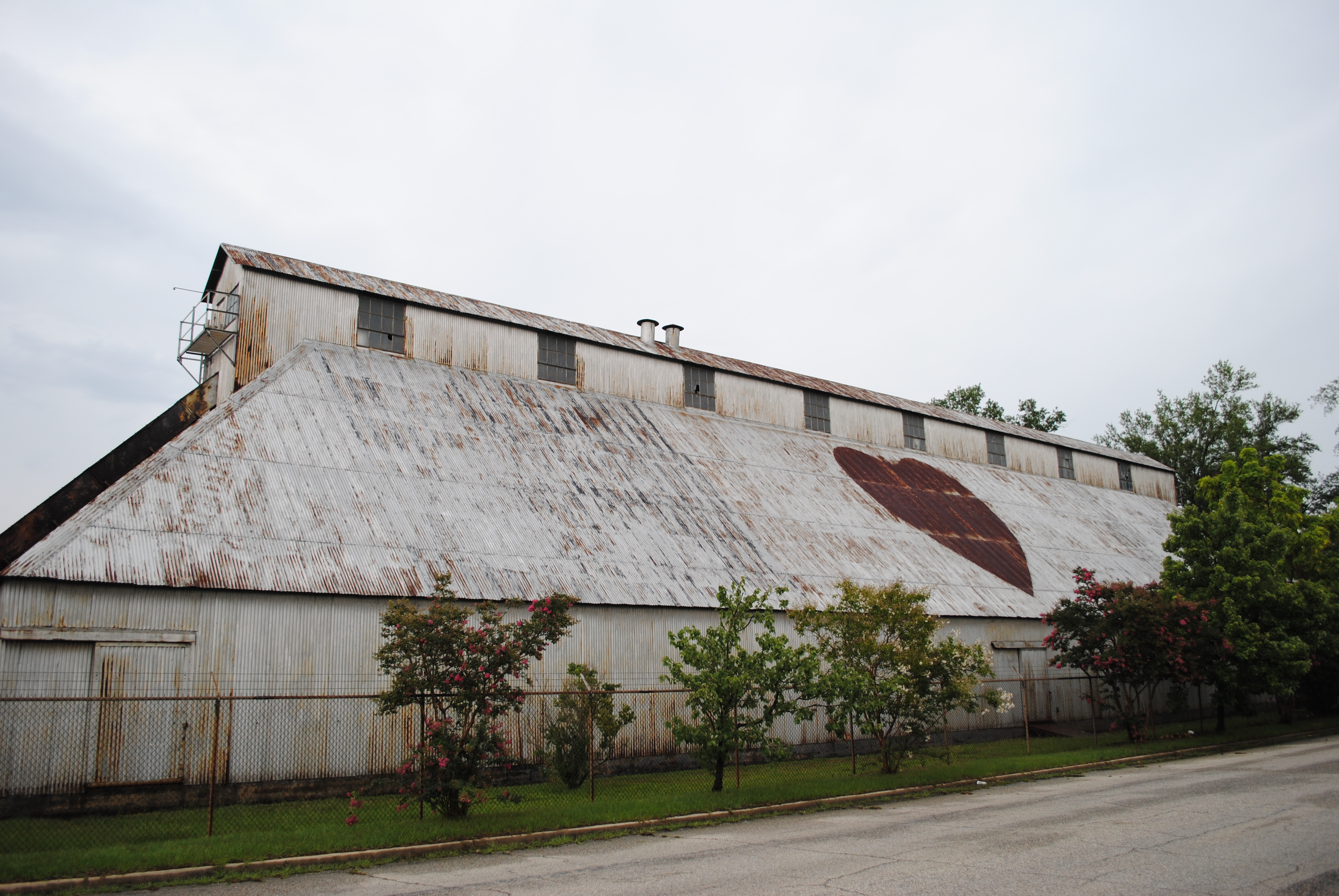
A warehouse in Hartsville, South Carolina belonging to the Coker Pedigreed Seed Company. The old heart logo that used to say "Blood Will Tell" is still visible on the tin roof.

Of the original Coker farm holdings, some 220 acres (89 ha) of the area used by Coker in his breeding experiments was listed as a National Historic Landmark in 1964 for its significance in revolutionizing the field of agriculture in the South. This area was roughly bounded on the south by United States Route 15, the east by Swift Creek Road, the north by the Seaboard Air Line tracks, and the west by a line paralleling west of South Carolina Highway 151, and included farm outbuildings dating to the 1930s in the west side of Highway 151. By the 1990s, the outbuildings had been demolished, and the land on the west side of Highway 151 developed commercially, and the landmark designation was reduced to 145 acres (59 ha), solely to the east of Highway 151. Since then, portions of the land on the east side have also been developed. A further-reduced parcel of farmland remains, on which a barn-shaped museum has been built to interpret the property and its importance.

=== Legal case ===
In 2005, the development of Coker Farms resulted in a seminal inverse condemnation case in the South Carolina Supreme Court, called Byrd v. City of Hartsville, that clarified South Carolina takings jurisprudence. In that case, the property owner of Coker Farm tracts sued the city of Hartsville alleging that its eleven-month delay in rezoning his parcels of Coker Farm for commercial use resulted in a taking that required just compensation. The court determined that the eleven-month delay was reasonable in light of the city's legitimate goal of keeping the Farm's national historic landmark status and therefore no taking had occurred.

== See also ==
- List of National Historic Landmarks in South Carolina
- National Register of Historic Places listings in Darlington County, South Carolina
