= Hartsville Armory =

- U.S. National Register of Historic Places
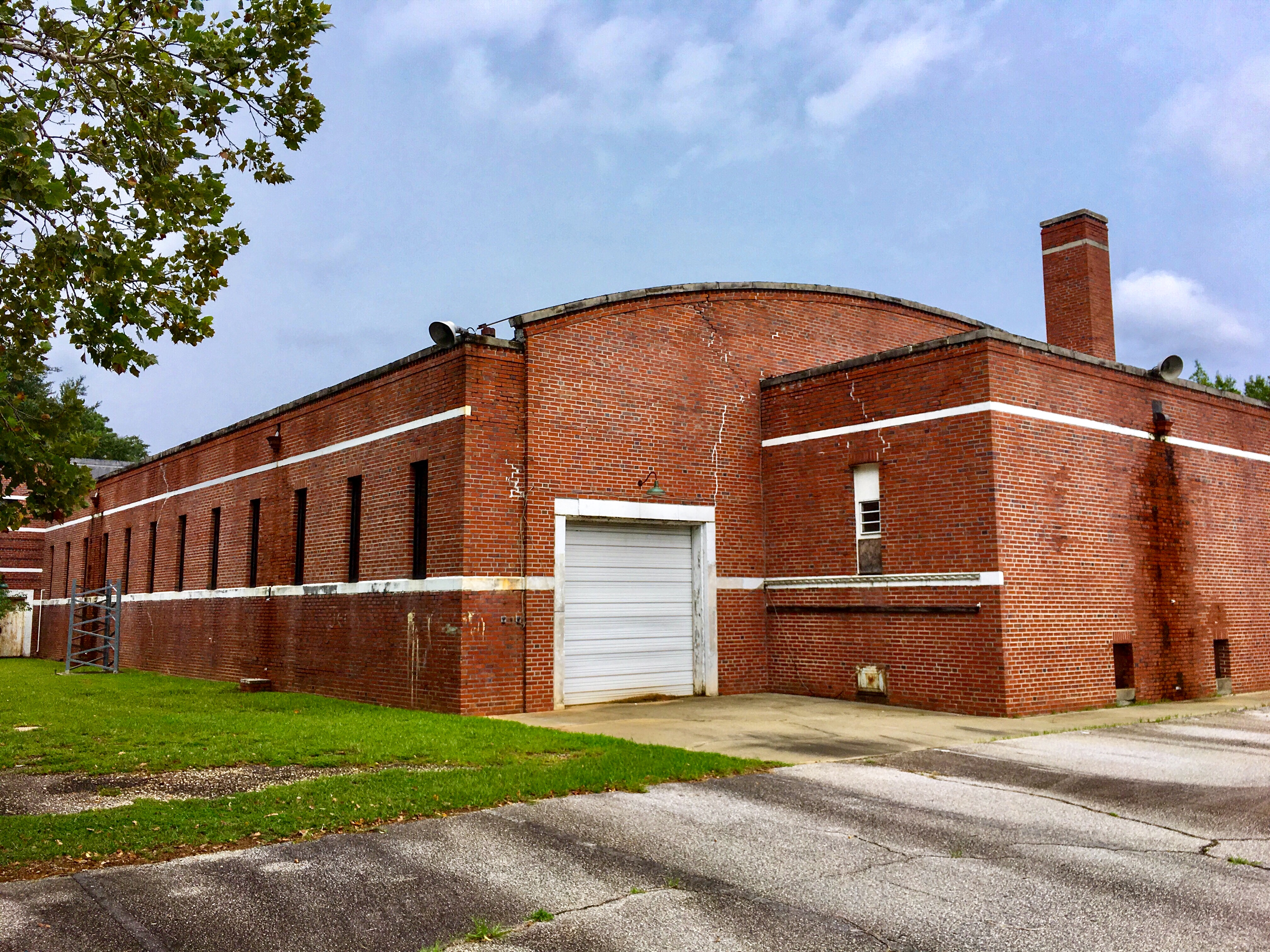
- The building in August 2018

- Location within South Carolina Location within the United States
- Location: 539 W. Carolina Ave., Hartsville, South Carolina
- Coordinates: 34°22′9″N 80°5′6″W
- Area: 1.6 acres (0.65 ha)
- Built: 1939-1940
- Architect: Singley, Heyward S.
- Architectural style: Modern Movement
- MPS: Hartsville MPS
- NRHP reference No.: 94001128
- Added to NRHP: September 8, 1994

Hartsville Armory is a historic National Guard armory located at Hartsville, Darlington County, South Carolina.

== History ==
The armory was built in 1939–1940, by the Works Progress Administration and designed by architect Heyward S. Singley (1902–1959) of Columbia, South Carolina. It is a two-story, 21 bay wide, rectangular brick Art Moderne style building. It has a flat roof behind stepped and overlaid parapets with a rat-tooth corbeled course and cast stone coping.

It was listed on the National Register of Historic Places in 1994.
