= Arcade Hotel (Hartsville, South Carolina) =

Historic hotel in South Carolina, US

- U.S. National Register of Historic Places
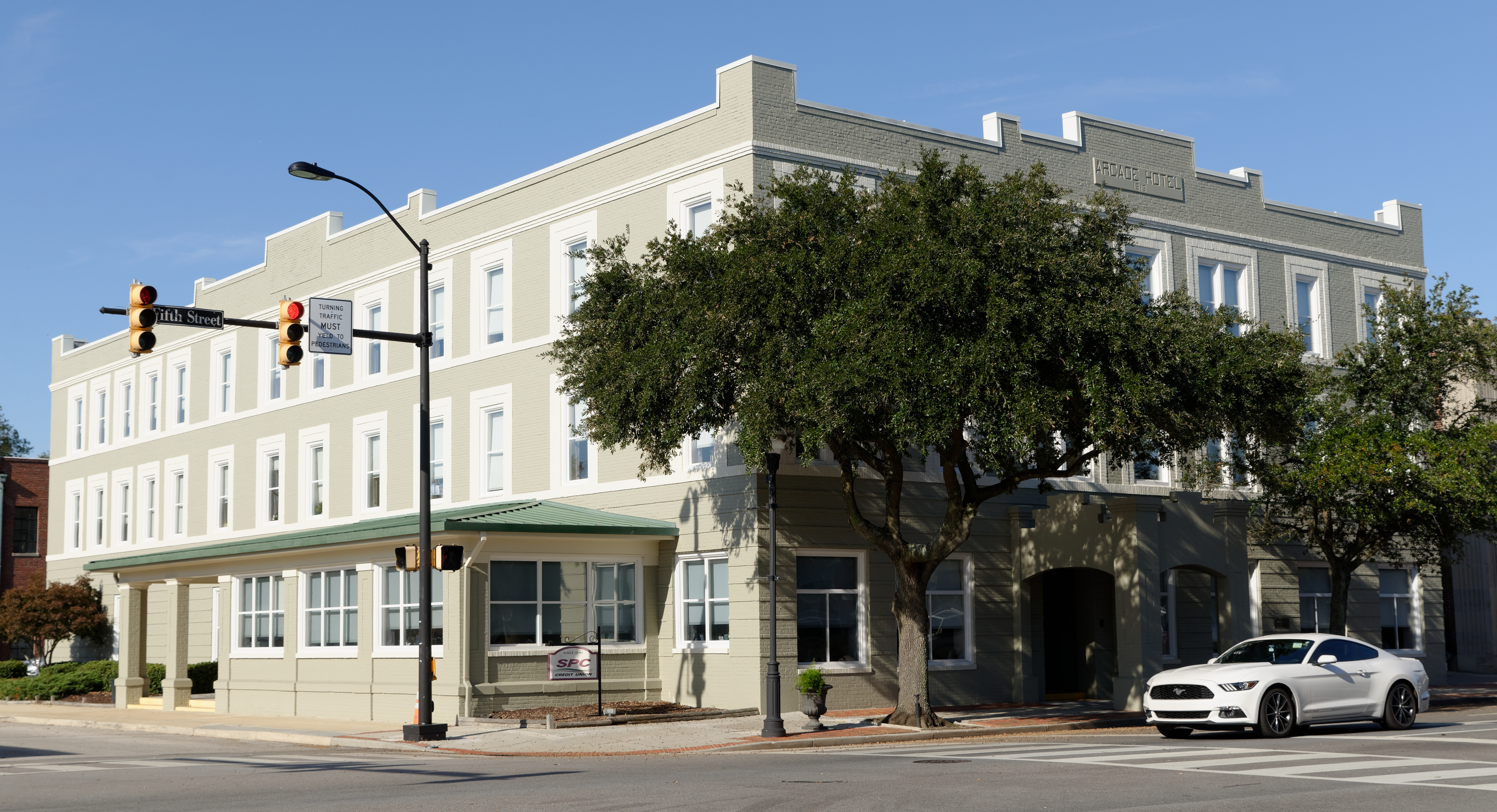

- Location within South Carolina Location within the United States
- Location: 204 N. Fifth St., Hartsville, South Carolina
- Coordinates: 34°22′30″N 80°4′28″W
- Area: 0.3 acres (0.12 ha)
- Built: 1913
- Architect: Richards, Ernest V.; Lawton, J.M.
- NRHP reference No.: 86003467
- Added to NRHP: December 19, 1986

Arcade Hotel is a historic hotel located at Hartsville, Darlington County, South Carolina. It was built in 1913, and is a three-story, brick, L-plan building with a one-story rear wing. The front facade features a rusticated first floor, and an entrance portico with two paneled brick pillars.

It was listed on the National Register of Historic Places in 1986 and is today home of SPC Credit Union.
