= J.B. Gilbert House =

Historic house in South Carolina, United States

- J. B. Gilbert House
- U.S. National Register of Historic Places
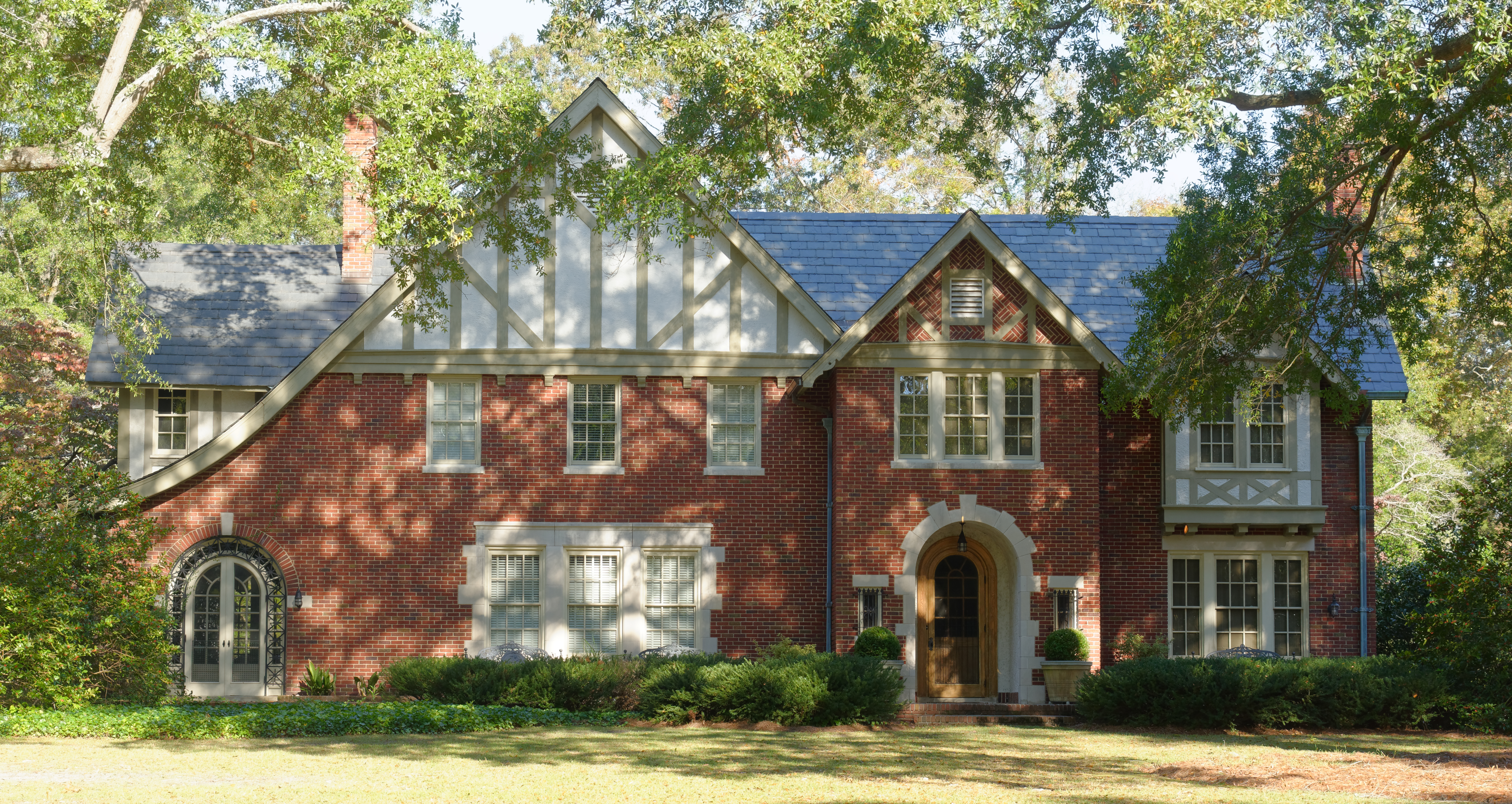

- Location within South Carolina Location within the United States
- Location: 200 Fairfield Terr., Hartsville, South Carolina
- Coordinates: 34°22′48″N 80°4′26″W
- Area: 1.8 acres (0.73 ha)
- Built: 1929
- Architect: Johnson, J. Carroll
- Architectural style: Tudor Revival
- MPS: Hartsville MPS
- NRHP reference No.: 91000473
- Added to NRHP: May 3, 1991

J. B. Gilbert House is a historic home located at Hartsville, Darlington County, South Carolina. It was built in 1929, and is a two-story, brick Tudor Revival style residence. It has a cross gable slate roof, limestone trim, decorative ironwork, half timbering, and herringbone brickwork in the gables. It was the home of John Barton Gilbert (1891-1953), a prominent Hartsville manufacturer and businessman. Gilbert served Sonoco first as a salesman, then an accountant, and finally as corporate treasurer.

It was listed on the National Register of Historic Places in 1991.
