= Jacob Kelley House =

Historic house in South Carolina, United States

- U.S. National Register of Historic Places
- Location within South Carolina Location within the United States
- Location: West of Hartsville on S-16-12, near Hartsville, South Carolina
- Coordinates: 34°20′59″N 80°8′45″W
- Area: 1 acre (0.40 ha)
- Built: c. 1835
- NRHP reference No.: 71000768
- Added to NRHP: May 6, 1971

Jacob Kelley House is a historic home located near Hartsville, Darlington County, South Carolina. The original one-story, log portion of the house predates 1830. The home was enlarged, weatherboarded, and a second story added about 1830–1840. It was later doubled with the addition of a two-story annex. It was the home of Jacob Kelley (1780-1874), prominent early settler and founder of the small agricultural community, Kelley Town. Its military significance stems from its use as headquarters for the Union troops of Gen. John E. Smith, Commander of the 3rd Division, 15th Army Corps, in March 1865. From this location the Federal troops commandeered the nearby Kelley Mills, ransacking and laying waste to the surrounding area.

It was listed on the National Register of Historic Places in 1971.

The house is open for tours on the first Sunday of the month from March through December.
