= Hartsville, South Carolina =

- City
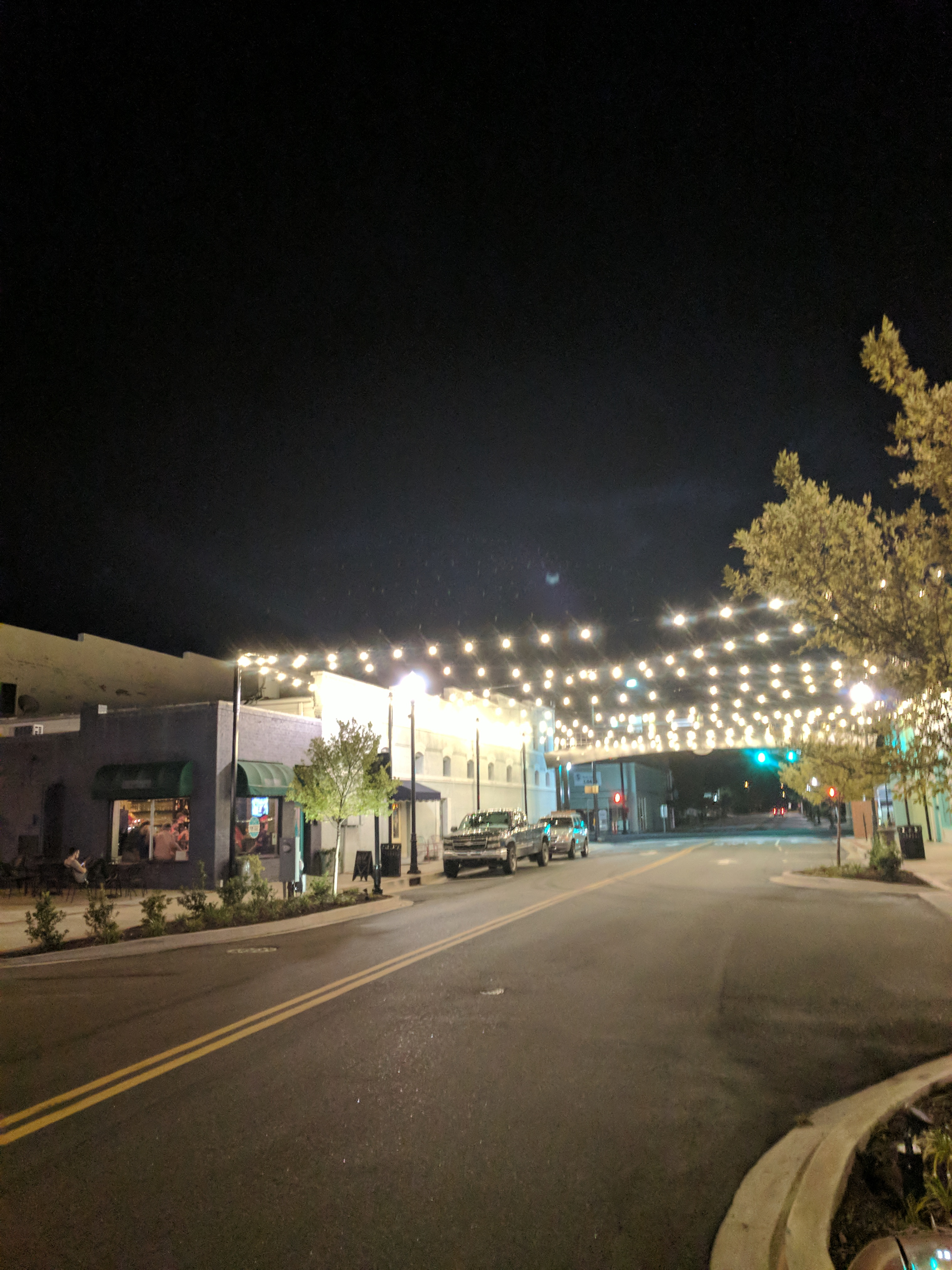
- Downtown Hartsville, SC

- Seal Logo
- Motto: "A small town with a big heart"
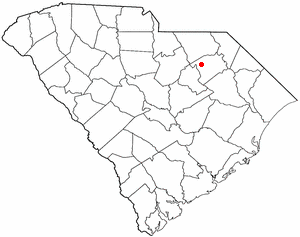
- Location of Hartsville, South Carolina
- Coordinates: 34°22′25″N 80°06′11″W
- Country: United States
- State: South Carolina
- County: Darlington
- Town of Hartsville: December 11, 1891

Government
  - Type: Council-manager

Area
  - Total: 5.99 sq mi (15.51 km^{2})
  - Land: 5.98 sq mi (15.49 km^{2})
  - Water: 0.012 sq mi (0.03 km^{2})
- Elevation: 220 ft (67 m)

Population (2020)
  - Total: 7,446
  - Density: 1,245.0/sq mi (480.71/km^{2})
- Time zone: UTC-5 (Eastern (EST))
  - Summer (DST): UTC-4 (EDT)
- ZIP codes: 29550, 29551
- Area codes: 843, 854
- FIPS code: 45-32560
- GNIS feature ID: 2403813
- Website: www.hartsvillesc.gov

Hartsville is the largest city in Darlington County, South Carolina, United States. It was chartered on December 11, 1891. As of the 2020 census, Hartsville had a population of 7,446. By Zip code (City Data and South Carolina Demographics) the population of Greater Hartsville is approximately 30,000. Hartsville was chosen as an All-America City in 1996 and again in 2016. Hartsville has also been a National Arbor Day Foundation Tree City since 1986.

Hartsville is home of Coker University and a branch of Florence–Darlington Technical College. It is also the home of the South Carolina Governor's School for Science and Mathematics, a public boarding high school.

The city is served by the Hartsville Regional Airport.

Hartsville is home to several major corporations including Sonoco Products Company, Duke Energy's H. B. Robinson Nuclear Generating Station, Novolex, and Stingray Boats.

== History ==
The area surrounding Hartsville was once home to several Native American tribes, including the Pee Dee, Catawba, Chicora, Edisto, Sane, and Chicora-Waccamaw, who inhabited the region until European settlers arrived.

Hartsville's first settlement began around 1760. The town is named for Captain Thomas E. Hart, who eventually owned most of the land in the community. Hart started a successful mercantile business, but lost his business and his land during the economic depression of 1837–1838.

In 1845, Thomas Hart's son, John Lide Hart, purchased 495 acres (200 ha) of land in what is now downtown Hartsville from Colonel Law. John Hart went on to establish a carriage factory, steam-powered saw mill, grist mill, general store, and Hartsville Baptist Church. Caleb Coker purchased the carriage factory for his son James Lide Coker in 1855.

James Lide Coker came to Hartsville in 1857 with plans to implement new farming methods he had learned at Harvard College. This was interrupted by the start of the Civil War, in which he became a major for the Confederacy. He returned to Hartsville injured and found that his plantation was in shambles. He planned to reconstruct his plantation and bring prosperity to the town of Hartsville. Major Coker established Welsh Neck High School, which later became Coker University. He also established a seed company, oil mill, fertilizer plant, the Coker and Company General Store, a bank, and the Southern Novelty Company, now known as Sonoco Products Company. Even with his own successes in business, Coker and his family were unable to convince other business owners in the area to build a railroad spur, so they decided to build their own, which became the Hartsville Railroad, completed in 1889.

The Town of Hartsville received its first charter on December 11, 1891, during a period of bustling economic activity and growth.

The railroad eventually became part of the South Carolina Central Railroad, and the Southern Novelty Company and Carolina Fiber Company merged to form Sonoco Products Company. Sonoco eventually expanded to a global scale and became a Fortune 500 company.

=== 1968 Hartsville two-car collision ===
At approximately 11:30 PM on Saturday, December 21, 1968, three young men were travelling northbound along South Carolina Highway 151 in a 1964 model car when as they were attempting to negotiate a "blind" curve, their vehicle suddenly merged into the opposite lane, causing a head-on collision with a 1965 model car that was driving southbound carrying five other young men. While seven of the eight victims were pronounced dead at the scene of the accident, a 17-year-old boy was the only survivor despite being severely injured. The county's worst vehicular accident in its history sent shockwaves across South Carolina and across the country.

In an investigation made and concluded by the Darlington County Police Department, the primary cause of the accident was the driver's failure of judgement via speeding and failing to negotiate a curve.

=== List of mayors of Hartsville, South Carolina ===
Hartsville's first Mayor was Wiley Kelly "W. K." Bell, sworn in during 1892 just after the City was chartered. He served a partial term before being proceeded by Major James Lide Coker.

#	Mayor	Sworn in	Left office	Comments
1	Wiley Kelly Bell	1892	1892	June 5, 1846 - November 25, 1899.
2	James Lide Coker	1892	1894	Major Coker served in the Confederate Army in the American Civil War and was elected to the South Carolina House of Representatives in 1864 before moving to Hartsville. January 3, 1837 - June 25, 1918.
3	J.S. White	1895	1896	
4	J.E. Bass	1896	1896	
5	C.J. Woodrow	1897	1897	
6	J.S. White	1898	1900	
7	D.R. Coker	1900	1901	
8	Murray Smith McKinnon	1902	1903	March 19, 1872 - January 14, 1938.
9	H.A. Edwards	1904	1906	
10	C.W. Coker	1907	1908	
11	Murray Smith McKinnon	1909	1910	March 19, 1872 - January 14, 1938.
12	E.A. Miller	1911	1916	
13	Lemuel Butts Stephenson, V	1919	1920	February 29, 1880 - May 15, 1956.
14	P.H. Rogers	1921	1926	
15	W.D. Arthur	1927	1930	
16	Rankin Eugene Sowell	1931	1934	October 15, 1891 - June 12, 1967.
17	C.H. Campbell	1935	1938	
18	L.H. Stokes	1939	1944	
19	G.J. Lawton	1945	1946	
20	Robert Wallace Shand	1947	1948	August 24, 1905 - September 10, 1996.
21	R.B. White	1949	1954	
22	P. Wilmeth	1955	1957	October 24, 1920 - December 25, 1995.
23	Theodore Lawrence Maxwell	1957	1963	November 29, 1901 - March 23, 1989.
24	O.D. Kelly	1963	1965	
25	Robert King Bass	1965	1973	February 16, 1925 - May 2, 1999
26	Dr. Glenn Johnston Lawhon, Jr.	1973	1985	July 3, 1925 - February 16, 2017.
27	Louis Matthew "Matt" Cannarella	1985	1993	October 16, 1954 - November 8, 2016
28	Flora "Flossie" C. Hopkins	1994	2001	Mayor Hopkins was Hartsville's first female Mayor. April 12, 1939 - January 25, 2021.
29	William A. Gaskins	2001	2005	Councilman Gaskins defeated Councilman Franklin Hines in the general election to win the Mayor's seat.
30	Michael Shea Holt, Sr.	2005	2009	In August 2009, Mayor Holt accepted an appointment as a judge and vacated his seat. May 1, 1970 - July 28, 2024
31	David L. McFarland	Aug. 2009	Nov. 2009	In August 2009, Mayor Pro Tem McFarland became mayor for the remainder of Mayor Holt's term when Holt stepped down to accept an appointment as a judge. Mayor McFarland was Hartsville's first Black mayor.
32	Carl "Mel" M. Pennington, IV	Nov 10, 2009	Dec 14, 2021	Decided to not run for a fourth term as Mayor in 2021.
33	Casey G. Hancock	Dec 14, 2021	Dec 9, 2025	Won the runoff election against challenger Justin Evans 55% to 45%.
34	Dan Gerald Askins, III	Dec 9, 2025	Incumbent	Won the election against incumbent Casey G. Hancock 54% to 46%.

=== Historic sites ===
Locations listed on the National Register of Historic Places:

- The Arcade Hotel
- E.W. Cannon House & Store
- Coker University
- Coker Experimental Farms
- J.L. Coker Company Building
- James L. Coker III House
- Robert R. Coker House
- S. Pressly Coker House
- Davidson Hall
- C.K. Dunlap House
- East Home Avenue Historic District
- J.B. Gilbert House
- Thomas E. Hart House
- Hartsville Armory
- Hartsville Passenger Station
- Hartsville Post Office
- Wade Hampton Hicks House
- Jacob Kelley House
- Lawton Park and Pavilion
- Magnolia Cemetery
- A.M. McNair House
- Memorial Hall
- Paul H. Rogers House
- West College Avenue Historic District

Locations recognized by the South Carolina Historical Markers Program as administered by the State Historic Preservation Office:

- Arcade Hotel
- Butler School
- Carolina Fiber Co. / Sonoco Products Company
- Coker's Pedigreed Seed Company
- Damascus Methodist Church
- David Robert Coker
- Eastern Carolina Silver Company
- First Baptist Church
- Hough's Hotel
- Hartsville Colored Cemetery
- Hartsville Cotton Mill
- Hartsville Graded School
- Hartsville Oil Mill
- Hartsville Passenger Depot
- James Lide Coker
- Jerusalem Baptist Church
- John L. Hart / John Hart House
- Primus Park
- St. Joseph's Catholic Church
- Thomas E. Hart House
- Welsh Neck High School / Coker College

=== Points of interest ===
- Center Theater
- Coker University
- Hartsville Museum
- Kalmia Gardens
- Sonoco Products

== Geography ==
Hartsville is located in northwestern Darlington County. U.S. Route 15 bypasses the city to the southeast; it leads northeast 17 miles (27 km) to Society Hill and 47 miles (76 km) to Laurinburg, North Carolina, and southwest 40 miles (64 km) to Sumter. South Carolina Highway 151 bypasses the city to the southwest; it leads southeast 14 miles (23 km) to Darlington, the county seat, and northwest 14 miles (23 km) to McBee. Columbia, the state capital, is 70 miles (110 km) to the southwest.

According to the United States Census Bureau, Hartsville has a total area of 6.2 square miles (16.0 km^{2}), of which 5.7 square miles (14.8 km^{2}) is land and 0.4 square miles (1.1 km^{2}), or 7.11%, is water. Prestwood Lake, an impoundment on Black Creek, is on the northern border of the city. Black Creek is part of the Pee Dee River watershed.

=== Climate ===
Hartsville enjoys a mild climate year-round. It experiences 213 sunny days on average. The number of days with measurable precipitation is 106, and the city receives about 46 inches (1,200 mm) of rainfall per year. The average low is 31 °F (−1 °C) in January, and the average high is 92 °F (33 °C) in July. During the winter months, Hartsville can receive snowfall.

Climate data for Hartsville, South Carolina (1991–2020 normals, extremes 1947–1955, 1994–present)
Month	Jan	Feb	Mar	Apr	May	Jun	Jul	Aug	Sep	Oct	Nov	Dec	Year
Record high °F (°C)	83 (28)	85 (29)	91 (33)	96 (36)	100 (38)	106 (41)	104 (40)	108 (42)	101 (38)	100 (38)	87 (31)	83 (28)	108 (42)
Mean maximum °F (°C)	75.0 (23.9)	77.5 (25.3)	84.2 (29.0)	88.7 (31.5)	93.7 (34.3)	98.2 (36.8)	98.9 (37.2)	98.2 (36.8)	94.1 (34.5)	88.1 (31.2)	80.1 (26.7)	75.1 (23.9)	100.6 (38.1)
Mean daily maximum °F (°C)	54.9 (12.7)	58.8 (14.9)	66.4 (19.1)	75.7 (24.3)	82.4 (28.0)	88.7 (31.5)	91.9 (33.3)	90.2 (32.3)	84.8 (29.3)	75.6 (24.2)	65.3 (18.5)	57.6 (14.2)	74.4 (23.6)
Daily mean °F (°C)	43.4 (6.3)	46.4 (8.0)	53.2 (11.8)	61.9 (16.6)	70.1 (21.2)	77.6 (25.3)	81.1 (27.3)	79.6 (26.4)	74.0 (23.3)	63.1 (17.3)	52.6 (11.4)	46.1 (7.8)	62.4 (16.9)
Mean daily minimum °F (°C)	31.9 (−0.1)	34.1 (1.2)	40.0 (4.4)	48.1 (8.9)	57.7 (14.3)	66.5 (19.2)	70.3 (21.3)	68.9 (20.5)	63.1 (17.3)	50.6 (10.3)	39.8 (4.3)	34.6 (1.4)	50.5 (10.3)
Mean minimum °F (°C)	16.4 (−8.7)	20.3 (−6.5)	25.2 (−3.8)	33.5 (0.8)	44.4 (6.9)	56.7 (13.7)	62.6 (17.0)	60.5 (15.8)	51.7 (10.9)	36.0 (2.2)	25.4 (−3.7)	21.3 (−5.9)	15.4 (−9.2)
Record low °F (°C)	8 (−13)	9 (−13)	15 (−9)	25 (−4)	38 (3)	49 (9)	54 (12)	53 (12)	41 (5)	22 (−6)	14 (−10)	13 (−11)	8 (−13)
Average precipitation inches (mm)	3.73 (95)	3.35 (85)	3.76 (96)	2.98 (76)	3.90 (99)	4.64 (118)	5.91 (150)	5.20 (132)	4.92 (125)	3.41 (87)	2.91 (74)	3.81 (97)	48.52 (1,232)
Average snowfall inches (cm)	0.1 (0.25)	0.3 (0.76)	0.0 (0.0)	0.0 (0.0)	0.0 (0.0)	0.0 (0.0)	0.0 (0.0)	0.0 (0.0)	0.0 (0.0)	0.0 (0.0)	0.0 (0.0)	0.1 (0.25)	0.5 (1.3)
Average precipitation days (≥ 0.01 in)	9.6	9.1	8.6	7.9	8.6	10.5	11.9	9.9	7.9	7.1	7.0	10.0	108.1
Average snowy days (≥ 0.1 in)	0.2	0.1	0.0	0.0	0.0	0.0	0.0	0.0	0.0	0.0	0.0	0.1	0.4
Source: NOAA

== Demographics ==
Historical population
Census	Pop.	Note	%±
1890	342		—
1900	704		105.8%
1910	2,365		235.9%
1920	3,624		53.2%
1930	5,067		39.8%
1940	5,399		6.6%
1950	5,658		4.8%
1960	6,392		13.0%
1970	8,017		25.4%
1980	7,631		−4.8%
1990	8,372		9.7%
2000	7,556		−9.7%
2010	7,764		2.8%
2020	7,446		−4.1%
U.S. Decennial Census

=== 2020 census ===
As of the 2020 census, Hartsville had a population of 7,446, 3,008 households, and 1,860 families residing in the city.

The population density was 1,257.77 people per square mile.

The median age was 36.6 years, 23.1% of residents were under the age of 18, and 18.8% were 65 years of age or older; for every 100 females there were 77.7 males, and for every 100 females age 18 and over there were 71.1 males age 18 and over.

98.1% of residents lived in urban areas, while 1.9% lived in rural areas.

There were 3,008 households in Hartsville, of which 31.4% had children under the age of 18 living in them. Of all households, 29.9% were married-couple households, 16.9% were households with a male householder and no spouse or partner present, and 47.6% were households with a female householder and no spouse or partner present. About 35.9% of all households were made up of individuals and 16.9% had someone living alone who was 65 years of age or older.

There were 3,615 housing units, of which 16.8% were vacant. The homeowner vacancy rate was 5.8% and the rental vacancy rate was 14.4%.

Racial composition as of the 2020 census
Race	Number	Percent
White	3,813	51.2%
Black or African American	3,167	42.5%
American Indian and Alaska Native	12	0.2%
Asian	93	1.2%
Native Hawaiian and Other Pacific Islander	5	0.1%
Some other race	65	0.9%
Two or more races	291	3.9%
Hispanic or Latino (of any race)	190	2.6%

== Economy ==
Major employers in the area include Sonoco Products Company, Nucor Corporation, Carolina Pines Regional Medical Center, Novolex, Stingray Boats, North Industrial Machine, and Duke Energy's H. B. Robinson Nuclear Generating Station.

At 4.3%, the unemployment rate is slightly higher than the national average of 3.9%. Job growth over the next decade is expected to be approximately 27.4% which is significantly lower than the US average of 33.5%. The household median income is $29,276/year which is significantly lower than the national median income of $53,482/year.

== Arts and culture ==
There are many festivals, parades, and other events that residents of Hartsville look forward to each year.

=== Annual events ===
- Screen on the Green is a summer event in which the city sets up a 25-foot (7.6 m) screen on the grounds of Burry Park and shows licensed movies. This is a family event that is free to the public. The Screen on the Green is sometimes held outside of its normal season, such as during the holidays.
- The "Hartsville Christmas Parade: a Miracle on Carolina Avenue" is an annual parade held in December of each year where members of numerous local and regional schools, businesses, and other organizations parade down the main street of the city. Santa Claus is usually found at the end of the parade as a symbol of Christmas coming soon.
- The Annual Mayor's Christmas Tree Lighting is held at Burry Park. There are musical and dance performances, and the Santa Mailbox, in which local children can submit letters to Santa Claus, is unveiled at this event.

== Parks ==
Hartsville has several parks within the city.

- Byerly Park is a 93-acre (38 ha) multi-use recreational park. The park has six soccer fields, eight softball/baseball fields, two football fields, six tennis courts, an eight-lane 400-meter track and field facility, twelve horseshoe pits, two playgrounds, a picnic area, concession stands, and the Piratesville Splash Pad. Piratesville is one of the largest splash pads in the state of South Carolina and operates Tuesday through Sunday when Darlington County Schools are out of session for summer vacation.
- Burry Park is an open green space in the heart of Hartsville. It is home to the Hartsville Veterans Memorial and Veterans Walk and the Tales on the Town bronze sculpture. Public restrooms are available. Burry Park hosts Hartsville's "Screen on the Green" film series, festivals, and other events.
- Centennial Park was developed for the 1981 centennial of Hartsville's incorporation. The park features covered sitting areas as well as a large fountain. During the Christmas season it hosts a large metal-frame lit Christmas tree.
- Lawton Park and Pavilion is located on 3.5 acres (1.4 ha) of land along Prestwood Lake. Lawton Park offers tennis courts, picnic shelters, a boardwalk and pier, and playgrounds. It is home to the Lawton Park Pavilion, a historic building constructed in 1938 by the city of Hartsville with funding from the Works Progress Administration. The facility is an example of New Deal-era recreation facilities. It was renovated in 2007 and 2008. It is available for private events and includes elevators and a caterer's kitchen. The playground at Lawton Park was replaced in 2015 to make it safer and more accessible.
- Pride Park features a picnic shelter, playground, restrooms and an outdoor stage used for events such as the annual "Gospel in the Park" series. The park is built on the site of the Hartsville Graded School, the first public school for black children in Hartsville, operating from about 1900 to 1921, as well as the later Butler School, named for the Rev. Henry H. Butler, longtime principal of the school. Park signage and a South Carolina Historical Marker placed at the park make note of the Rev. T.J. James, who began a Sunday school at the site in 1922 which grew into Mt. Pisgah Presbyterian Church. James also established the Mt. Pisgah Nursery School in the old graded school structure. James' family donated the land to the city of Hartsville for Pride Park, which was established in 1986.
- The Vista is a pedestrian corridor built along Railroad Avenue between Coker Avenue and Second Street, connecting the South Carolina Governor's School for Science and Mathematics and portions of Coker College with downtown Hartsville. The space was redeveloped in 2009–10 by the city of Hartsville from a portion of the former Hartsville railroad yard which once connected Hartsville's downtown with major rail lines. The green space in The Vista features a walking path, a pond, fountains and park benches.
- The Hartsville Dog Park has been built within Byerly park. (...is an as-of-yet unbuilt but planned dog park which the city will begin construction on in the near future. Plans for this park were unveiled in early 2016. Land for this park has been acquired by the city at the corners of Coker Avenue and Railroad Avenue, near The Vista. Dogs will be allowed to roam freely without a leash and the park will be divided by fencing into two separate areas: one for large dogs and one for small dogs. The city will require that owners provide proof of current vaccinations for their pets in order to utilize this public space...) The park will also be equipped with a washing station, covered benches, and waste bag receptacles. At present there is a fenced-in area at Byerly park for dogs. There are two sections (big dogs and small dogs) plus a water station and waste bags.

== City government and programs ==
Hartsville has a council–manager government. The city council, Hartsville's legislative body, is made of a mayor who is elected at large, and six council members who are elected in single-member districts, with one member elected by his/her peers as Mayor Pro-Tem. Regular meetings take place on the second Tuesday of the month. City Hall is located at 100 E Carolina Avenue in a building previously occupied by the Bank of America. The new city hall opened in mid-2013. It has been praised by the citizens of Hartsville as a significant upgrade for the downtown area.

=== Main Street Hartsville ===
The Main Street Hartsville program is a partnership of the City of Hartsville, the Community Foundation for a Better Hartsville, and Main Street South Carolina, a program of the National Main Street Center. The organization seeks to build a vibrant downtown in Hartsville, focusing on thriving businesses, entertainment, recreating and historic preservation. It follows the Main Street "Four Point Approach" of organization, promotion, design, and economic restructuring. Main Street Hartsville administers a Sign and Paint grant for local businesses. It also oversees the Hartsville Farmers Market, Start-Up Hartsville, and Hartsville for the Holidays. They periodically hold contests for local businesses.

== Education ==
The public schools in Hartsville are governed by the Darlington County School District. For the 2019–2020 school year, the district approved a fiscal budget of $95,383,423.13. The district-wide student-to-teacher ratio is about 16:1 and the district spends about $14,178 per student.

=== Public primary education ===
- Carolina Elementary
- Bay Road Elementary
- Butler Academy (Charter school)
- Hartsville Middle School
- North Hartsville Elementary
- Southside Early Childhood Center
- Thornwell School of the Arts
- Washington St. Elementary
- West Hartsville Elementary

=== Public secondary education ===
- Hartsville High
- Mayo High School for Math, Science, and Technology, located in Darlington, serves students from the entire county, including Hartsville.
- South Carolina Governor's School for Science and Mathematics

=== Private schools ===
- Thomas Hart Academy (grades 2K-8) is located 5 miles (8 km) south of the city and has a Hartsville mailing address.
- Emmanuel Christian School (grades 2K-12), located just east of downtown Hartsville.
- Students from Hartsville attend other private schools in the area, Robert E. Lee Academy (grades 2K-12), and Trinity Collegiate School (grades 7–12).

=== Higher education ===
Coker University, a private, baccalaureate-granting institution, is located in Hartsville. It offers a four-year program that emphasizes a practical application of the liberal arts, as well as hands-on and discussion-based learning within and beyond the classroom.

Florence–Darlington Technical College, based in nearby Florence, South Carolina, maintains a satellite campus in Hartsville.

=== Library ===
Hartsville has a public library, a branch of the Darlington County Library System.

== Media ==
Hartsville is served by several local, regional, and state media outlets. The Hartsville Messenger, an affiliate of SCNow, is the local newspaper, with The State serving as a source for statewide news. WBTW News 13, WPDE-TV News 15, and WFXB Fox TV are the news channels that serve the Hartsville area as well as the entire Pee Dee and Grand Strand regions.

== Infrastructure ==
Downtown Hartsville and most neighborhoods in Hartsville are designed around a standard grid layout whose use began when the city first developed. However, in newly developed sections of the city, such as around Hartsville Crossing, the road layout is less orthodox.

Hartsville is located 14 miles (23 km) north of Interstate 20 and 20 miles (32 km) northwest of Interstate 95.

== Utilities ==
The City of Hartsville maintains garbage and recycling services for residents within the city limits, as well as water services. Electric services are provided by Duke Energy and Pee Dee Electric Cooperative. Dish Network, DirecTV, AT&T, and Spectrum serve television and internet needs.

== Healthcare ==
Carolina Pines Regional Medical Center is a large medical complex located on the edge of Hartsville. The hospital has 116 beds available for patients, not including those located in the hospital's Level III capable trauma/ER unit.

== Notable people ==
- Aziz Ansari, actor and comedian
- Rich Batchelor, former MLB relief pitcher
- Rufus Bess, former NFL cornerback
- Roderick Blakney, "MooMoo", former professional basketball player
- James Robert Campbell, "Jim", former MLB pinch hitter
- James Lide Coker, founder of Sonoco and Coker College
- Chad Dawson, former professional boxer and light heavyweight champion
- Leeza Gibbons, television personality
- Cpt. Thomas Edward Hart, founder of Hartsville, SC in 1817
- Albert Haynesworth, former NFL defensive lineman
- Terrance Herrington, former US Olympic Track & Field athlete
- Shannon Johnson, "Pee Wee", former basketball player
- Mildred M. Jordan, former medical librarian
- Jody Lavender, stock car racing driver
- Jordan Lyles, MLB pitcher, currently a free agent
- Tony McDaniel, former NFL defensive lineman
- Kelvin Moses, former NFL linebacker
- Bobo Newsom, former MLB pitcher
- Jeryl Prescott, American actress, best known for her role as Jacqui
- Joseph Monroe Segars, former Ambassador to Cape Verde
