= Charles C. Wilson (architect) =

American architect (1864–1933)

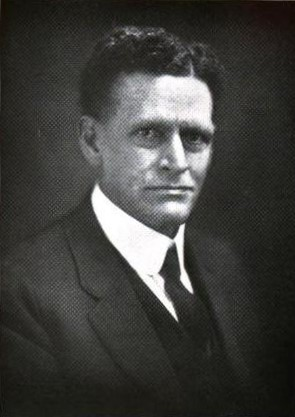
- Charles C. Wilson, circa 1920
- Born: November 20, 1864; Hartsville, South Carolina
- Died: January 26, 1933 (aged 68); Columbia, South Carolina
- Occupation: Architect
- Awards: Fellow, American Institute of Architects (1914)
- Practice: Wilson & Huggins, Tinsley & Wilson, Wilson & Edwards, Wilson & Wendell, Wilson, Sompayrac & Urquhart, Wilson & Sompayrac, Wilson & Berryman, Wilson, Berryman & Kennedy, Wilson & Tatum

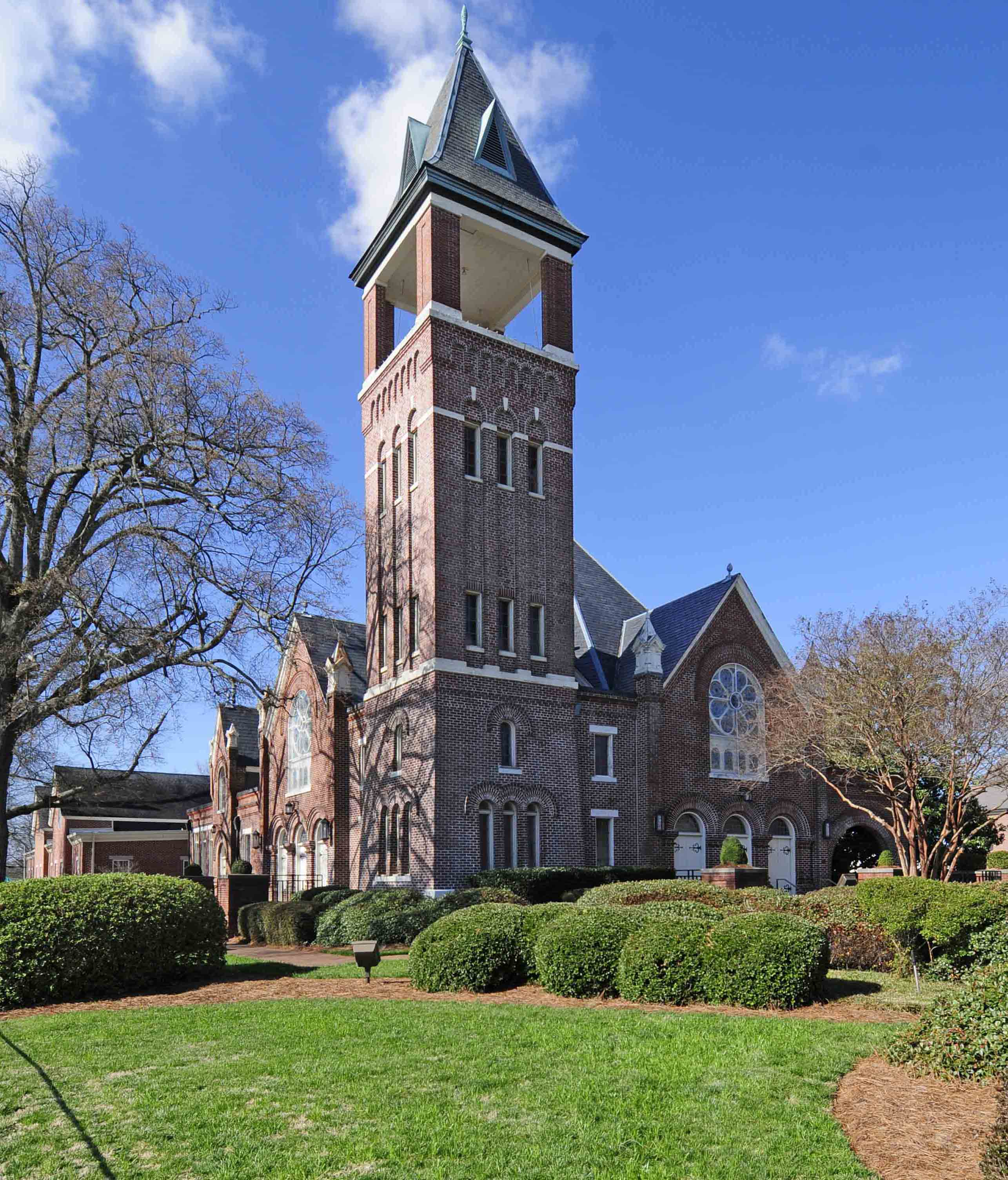
The First Presbyterian Church of Rock Hill, South Carolina, designed by Charles C. Wilson and completed in 1895.

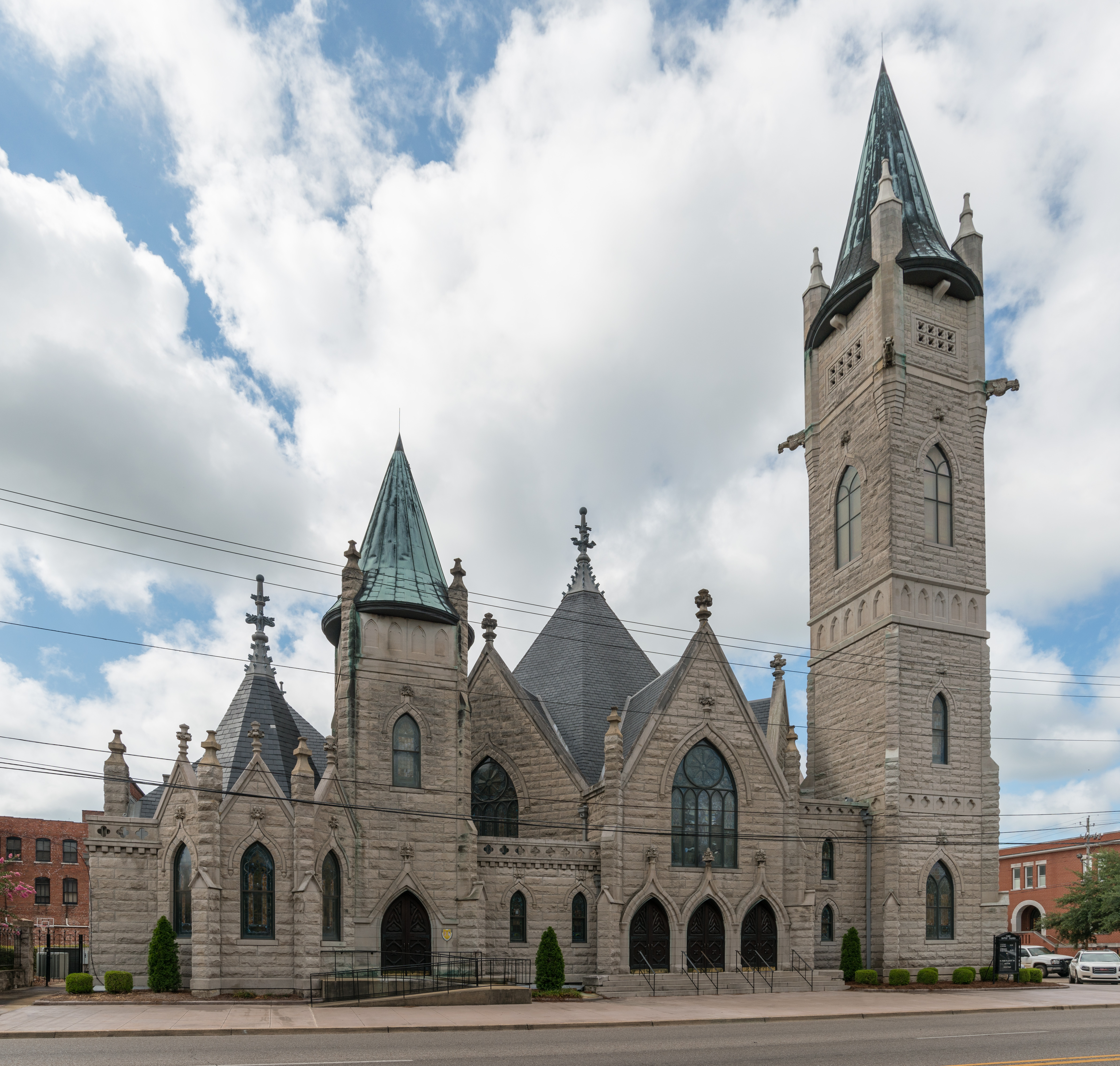
The First Baptist Church of Selma, Alabama, designed by Wilson & Edwards and completed in 1904.

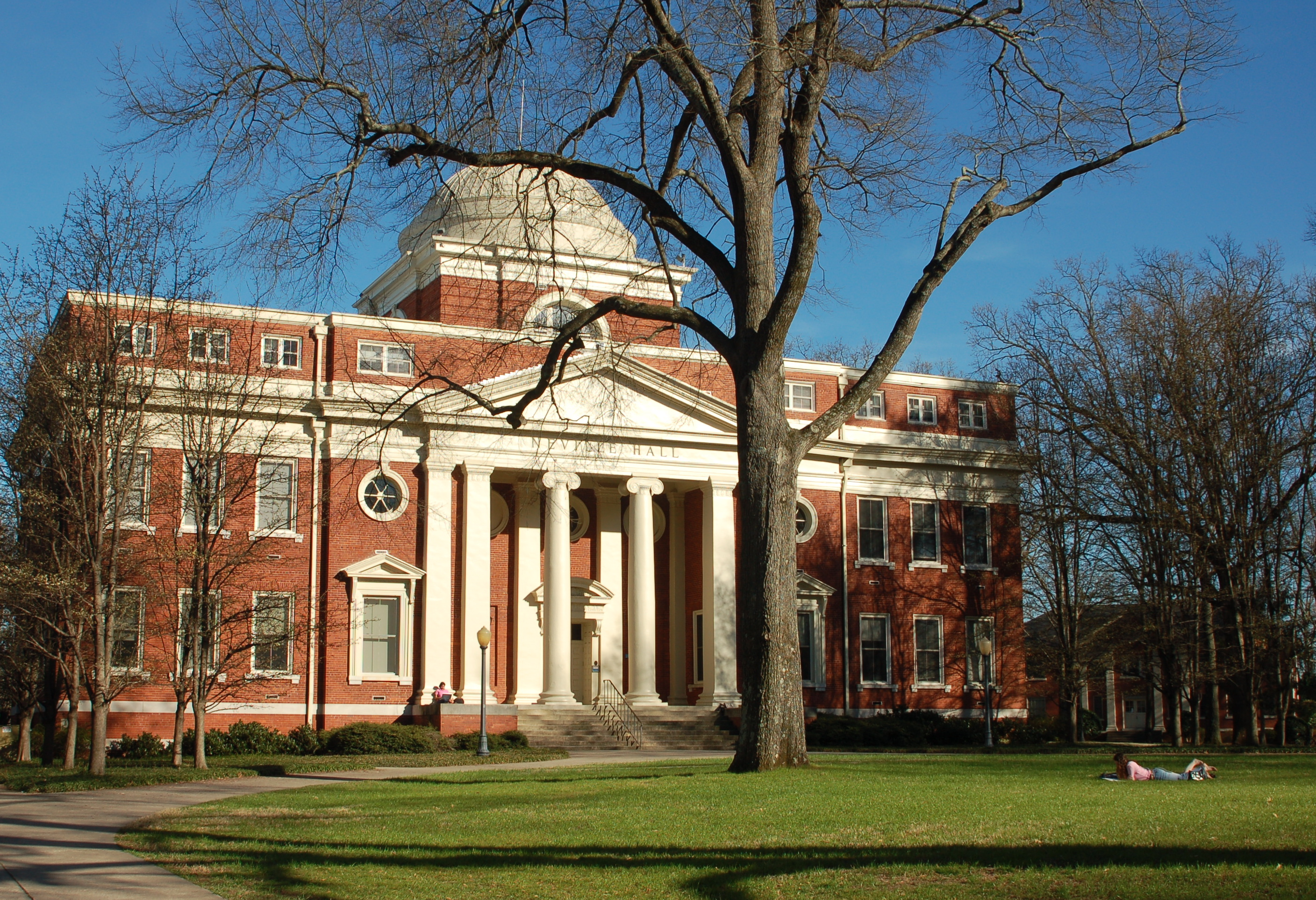
Neville Hall of Presbyterian College, designed by Wilson & Wendell and completed in 1907.

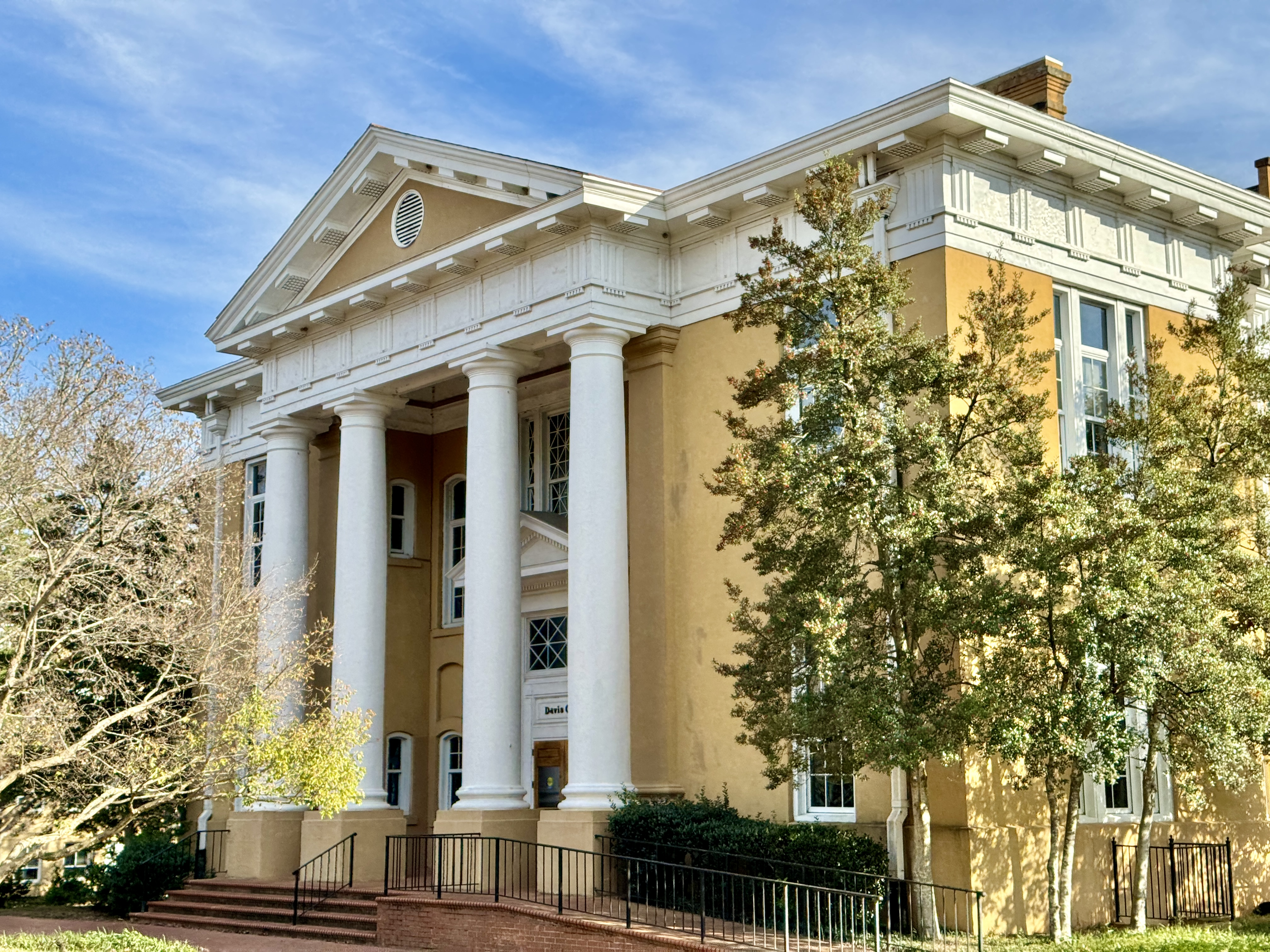
Davis College of the University of South Carolina, designed by Wilson, Sompayrac & Urquhart and completed in 1909.

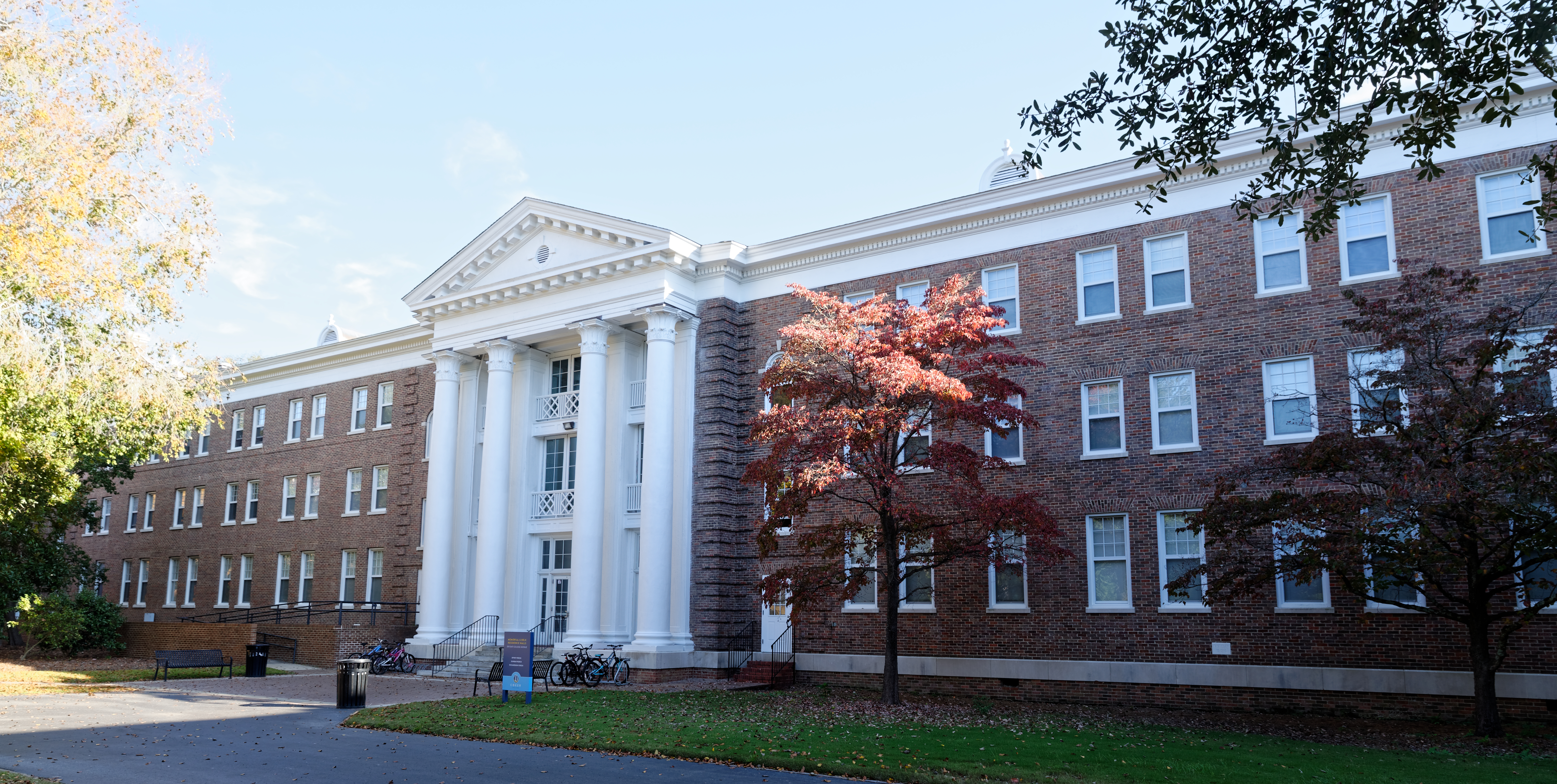
Memorial Hall of Coker University, designed by Wilson & Sompayrac and completed in phases in 1913 and 1916.

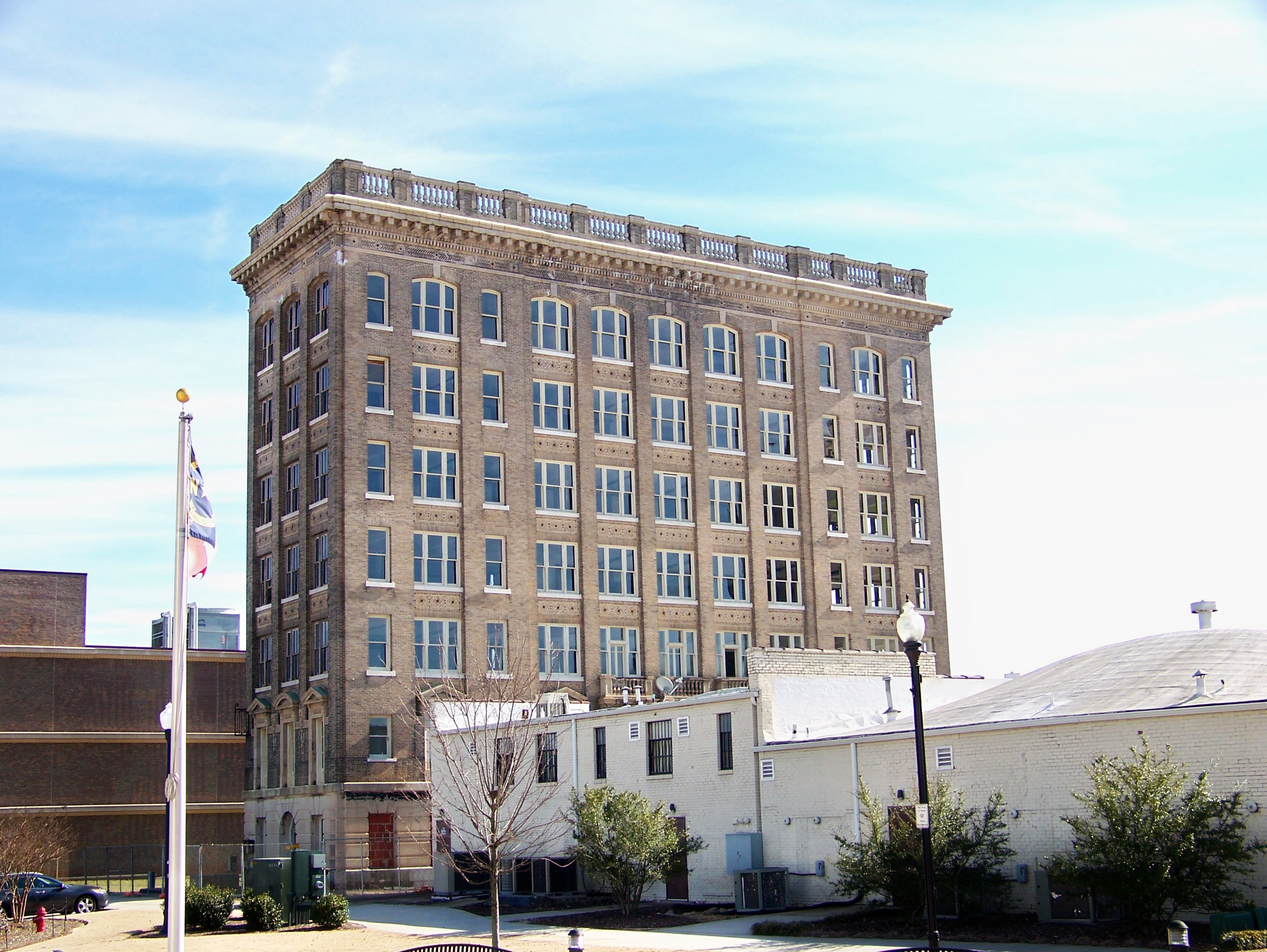
The First National Bank Building in Gastonia, North Carolina, designed by Wilson & Sompayrac and completed in 1917.

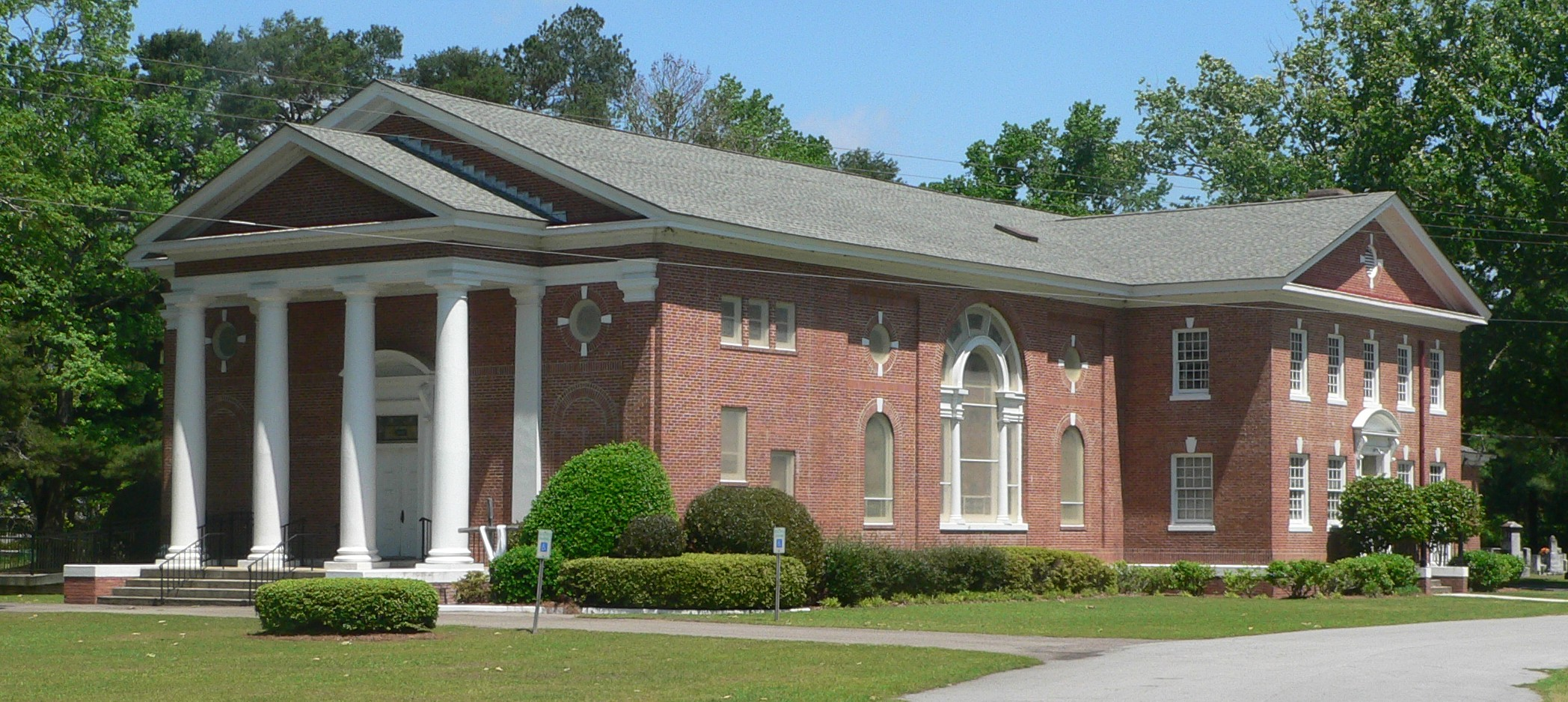
Providence Methodist Church in Holly Hill, South Carolina, designed by Charles C. Wilson and completed in 1920.

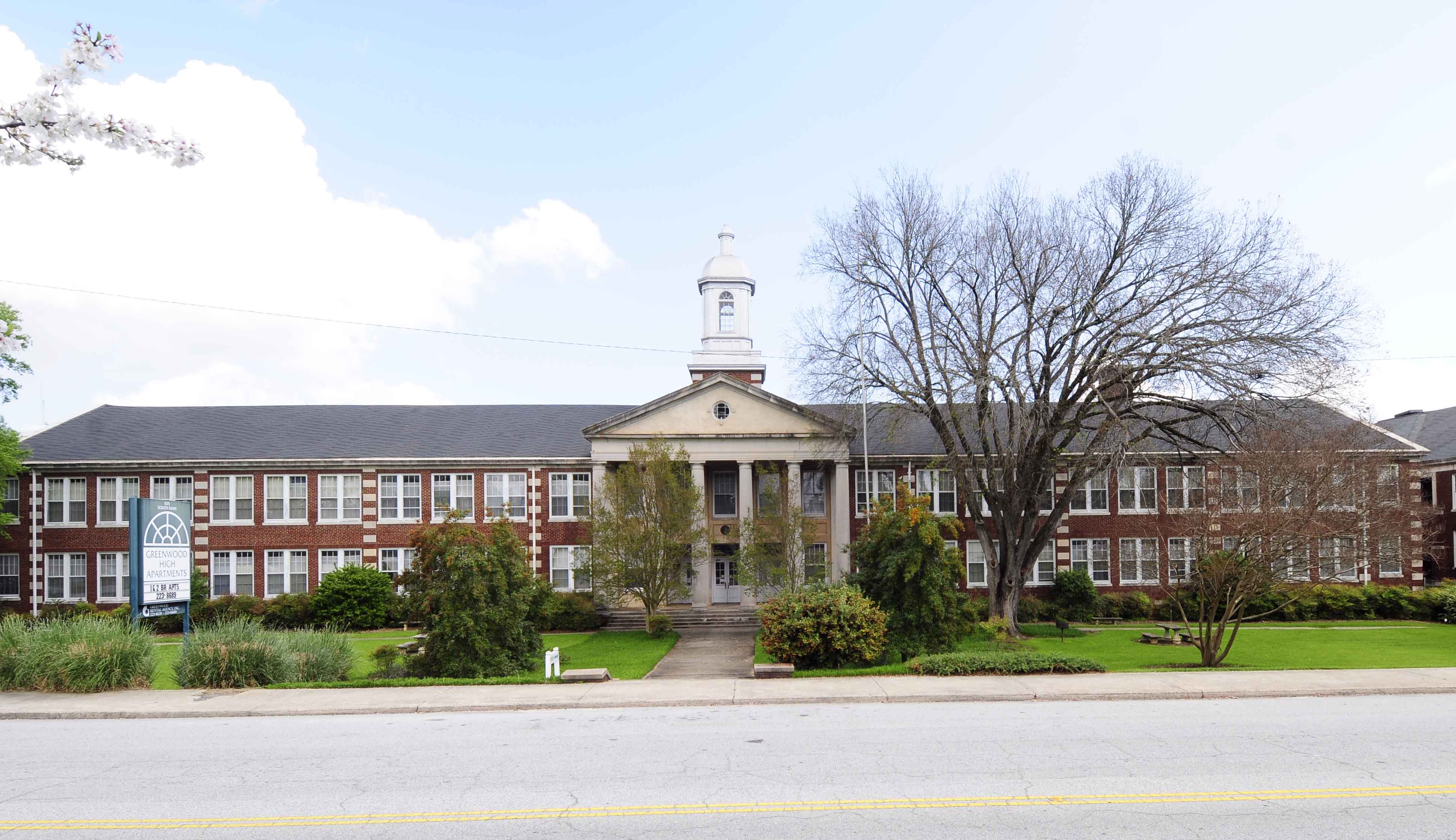
The former Greenwood High School, designed by Wilson, Berryman & Kennedy and completed in 1926.

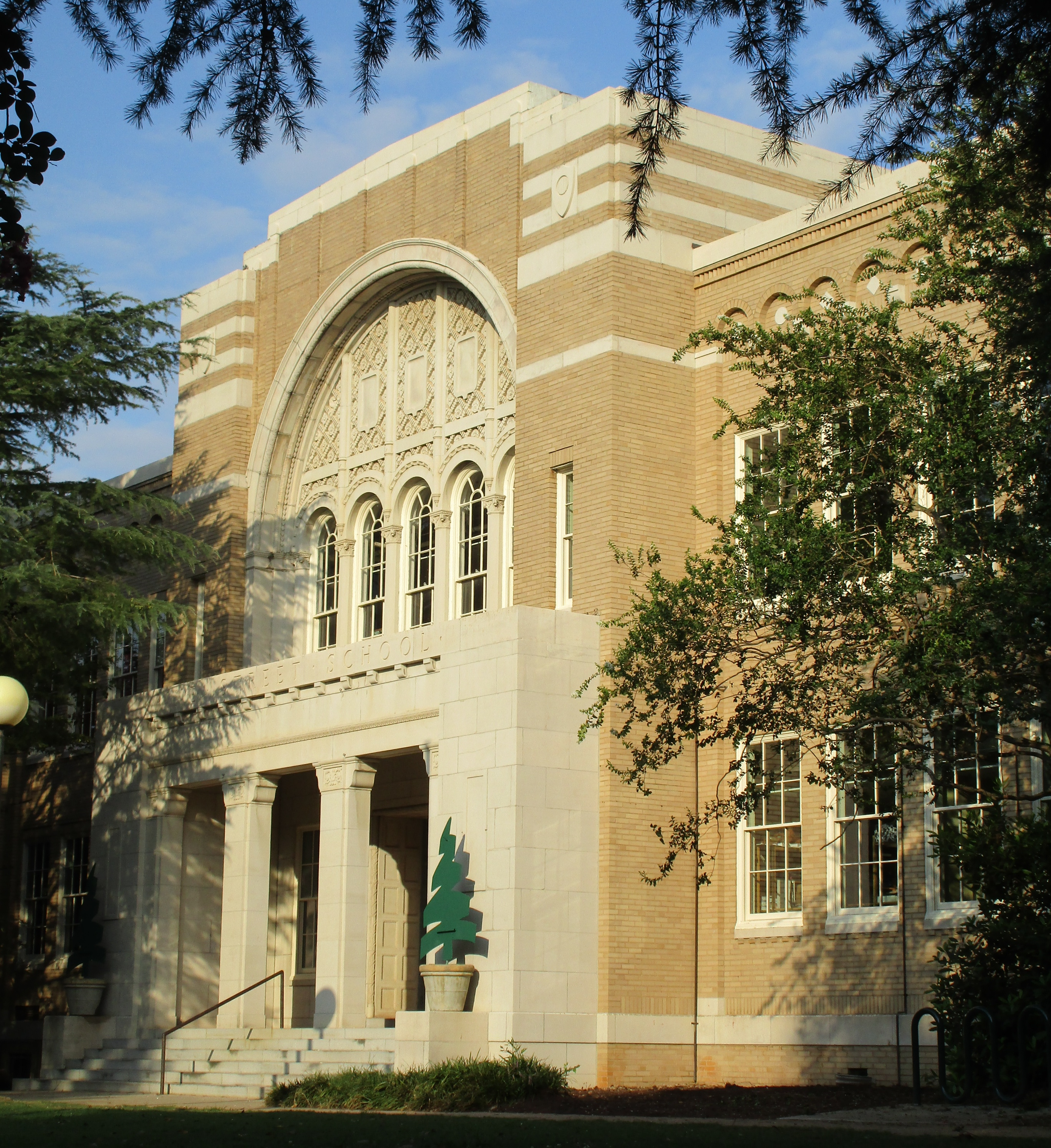
Pine Street Elementary School in Spartanburg, South Carolina, designed by Charles C. Wilson and completed in 1929.

Charles C. Wilson FAIA (November 20, 1864 – January 26, 1933) was an American architect in practice in Columbia, South Carolina, from 1896 until his death in 1933.

== Life and career ==
Charles Coker Wilson was born November 20, 1864, in Hartsville, South Carolina, to Furman Edwards Wilson, a physician, and Jane Lide Wilson, née Coker. James Lide Coker, the founder of Sonoco and Coker University, was his uncle. He was educated at South Carolina College, now the University of South Carolina, graduating in 1886 with an AB. He then joined the Columbia, Newberry and Laurens Railroad as first assistant engineer. While employed by the railroad he supervised the construction of the bridge over the Broad River at Columbia. This enabled him to pursue post-graduate study at his alma mater, and in 1888 he was awarded a degree in civil engineering from the reorganized University of South Carolina. In 1890 Wilson left the railroad to establish an independent practice in Roanoke, Virginia, which in 1891 became the partnership of Wilson & Huggins with architect H. H. Huggins. In 1893 this was dissolved, and Wilson returned to independent practice as both architect and engineer. In 1895 he briefly joined architect Walter P. Tinsley in Lynchburg, and in 1896 moved his office to Columbia, where he was appointed city engineer.

In 1899 after his retirement from that office he formed the partnership of Wilson & Edwards with William Augustus Edwards, an employee since 1893. Wilson then left the office under Edwards' management and went to Paris, where he studied in the Beaux-Arts atelier of Henry Duray, a patron popular with American students. In 1900 he returned to the United States and in 1902 dissolved his partnership. His year in Paris had a major influence on his work, which for the rest of his career exhibited the formal principles of Beaux-Arts architecture. During the next several years he was assisted by Joseph F. Leitner, though they were not partners. In 1905 he formed the new partnership of Wilson & Wendell with Henry Ten Eyck Wendell, but this was dissolved after a year. In 1907 he completed the South Carolina State House, originally begun in 1851, and formed a longer-lived partnership, Wilson, Sompayrac & Urquhart, with Edwin D. Sompayrac and James B. Urquhart. Urquhart withdrew in 1910, but Wilson & Sompayrac continued until its dissolution in 1919. Wilson & Sompayrac served as supervising architects for the Palmetto Building, designed by Julius Harder and completed in 1913.

From his Columbia office Wilson became the leading architect in South Carolina and developed a practice that extended north into North Carolina and Virginia and south into Alabama, Florida and Georgia. In 1918 Wilson established a branch office in Gastonia, North Carolina, under the management of Hugh Edward White, and in 1919 a third office was established at Wilson under the management of George R. Berryman. In 1923 the new partnership of Wilson & Berryman was formed, and expanded in 1924 as Wilson, Berryman & Kennedy to include J. Robie Kennedy. In 1925 the branch offices at Gastonia and Wilson were closed and new ones opened at Charlotte and Raleigh. These too were closed in 1927 when the partnership of Wilson, Berryman & Kennedy was dissolved. In 1929 Wilson formed his last partnership, Wilson & Tatum, with Harold Tatum, a Philadelphian in practice in Columbia since 1920. This lasted until Wilson's death, after which Tatum chose to continue his practice in Charleston.

Wilson was an important figure in the professionalization of architecture in the Carolinas. In 1893 he joined the Southern chapter of the American Institute of Architects (AIA), which soon faltered but is seen as a major step in the professionalization of architecture in the larger South. In 1905 he formally joined the AIA, and was chief mover behind the establishment of both the South and North Carolina chapters. He served as the first president of the South Carolina chapter. For his efforts he was elected a Fellow of the AIA in 1914. In 1917, when a licensure law for architects was passed by the South Carolina legislature, Wilson was appointed to the board of architecture examiners by governor Richard Irvine Manning III. He was a member of this board until his death. He was an author of the South Carolina school building code in 1923 and the state building code in 1932. He was also a member of the American Society of Civil Engineers.

== Personal life ==
Wilson was married in Columbia in 1889 to Adeline Selby, daughter of Julian Selby. They had three daughters, one of which died in infancy. He was a Democrat and was a deacon and treasurer of the First Presbyterian Church of Columbia.

Wilson died January 26, 1933, in Columbia at the age of 68.

== Legacy ==
A number of his works are listed on the United States National Register of Historic Places.

== Architectural works ==
All dates are date of completion.

=== Wilson & Huggins, 1891–1893 ===
- 1896 – Fincastle Baptist Church (former), 45 E Main St, Fincastle, Virginia

=== Charles C. Wilson, 1893–1895 ===
- 1895 – First Presbyterian Church, (Note: NRHP-listed.) 234 E Main St, Rock Hill, South Carolina

=== Tinsley & Wilson, 1895–1896 ===
- 1896 – Central Graded School, (Note: Demolished.) 414 W Market St, Anderson, South Carolina

=== Wilson & Edwards, 1896–1902 ===
- 1897 – Japonica Hall, (Note: A contributing property to the Welsh Neck–Long Bluff–Society Hill Historic District, NRHP-listed in 1974.) S Main St, Society Hill, South Carolina
- 1897 – Thomas Memorial Baptist Church, (Note: A contributing property to the Bennettsville Historic District, NRHP-listed in 1978.) 308 W Main St, Bennettsville, South Carolina
- 1900 – Ebenezer Lutheran Chapel remodeling, 1301 Richland St, Columbia, South Carolina
- 1900 – Masonic Temple, 1425 Main St, Columbia, South Carolina
- 1901 – Steward's Hall, (Note: Designed by Walter & Legare, architects, with Wilson & Edwards, supervising architects.) University of South Carolina, Columbia, South Carolina
- 1904 – First Baptist Church, 325 Lauderdale St, Selma, Alabama

=== Charles C. Wilson, 1902–1905 ===
- 1902 – Bank of Georgetown Building, Front and Broad Sts, Georgetown, South Carolina
- 1903 – Jerome Hotel, 1301 Main St, Columbia, South Carolina
- 1903 – Park in the Pines, Aiken, South Carolina

=== Wilson & Wendell, 1905–1906 ===
- 1907 – Coppin Hall, (Note: A contributing property to the Waverly Historic District, NRHP-listed in 1989.) Allen University, Columbia, South Carolina
- 1907 – Neville Hall, (Note: A contributing property to the Thornwell–Presbyterian College Historic District, NRHP-listed in 1982.) Presbyterian College, Clinton, South Carolina

=== Charles C. Wilson, 1906–1907 ===
- 1907 – First Baptist Church, 1020 Boundary St, Newberry, South Carolina
- 1908 – First Baptist Church, (Note: A contributing property to the East Home Avenue Historic District, NRHP-listed in 1991.) 104 E Home Ave, Hartsville, South Carolina
- 1908 – Woodrow Memorial Presbyterian Church, 2221 Washington St, Columbia, South Carolina

=== Wilson, Sompayrac & Urquhart, 1907–1910 ===
- 1908 – Bethel Park Methodist Church, 25 Beech Ave, Denmark, South Carolina
- 1908 – Winyah Indigo School, 1200 Highmarket St, Georgetown, South Carolina
- 1909 – Davis College, University of South Carolina, Columbia, South Carolina
- 1910 – Barnwell College, University of South Carolina, Columbia, South Carolina
- 1910 – J. L. Coker Company Building, 111 E Carolina Ave, Hartsville, South Carolina
- 1910 – Davidson Hall, Coker University, Hartsville, South Carolina
- 1910 – Lydia Plantation, 703 W Lydia Hwy, Lydia, South Carolina

=== Wilson & Sompayrac, 1910–1919 ===
- 1911 – Mount Zion Presbyterian Church, 4544 Manville St Charles Rd, Bishopville, South Carolina
- 1911 – Port Royal School, 1214 Paris Ave, Port Royal, South Carolina
- 1912 – Bank of Bishopville Building, (Note: A contributing property to the Bishopville Commercial Historic District, NRHP-listed in 1986.) 140 N Main St, Bishopville, South Carolina
- 1913 – Bouchier Building, (Note: A contributing property to the Columbia Commercial Historic District, NRHP-listed in 2014.) 1722–1724 Main St, Columbia, South Carolina
- 1913 – Logan Elementary School, 815 Elmwood Ave, Columbia, South Carolina
- 1913 – Memorial Hall, Coker University, Hartsville, South Carolina
- 1913 – Palmetto Building, (Note: Designed by Julius Harder, architect, with Wilson & Sompayrac, supervising architects.) 1400 Main St, Columbia, South Carolina
- 1913 – Thornwell College, University of South Carolina, Columbia, South Carolina
- 1914 – Latta Library, 101 N Marion St, Latta, South Carolina
- 1914 – Woodrow College, University of South Carolina, Columbia, South Carolina
- 1915 – House of Peace Synagogue (former), 1000 Hampton St, Columbia, South Carolina
- 1916 – Camden Public Library (former), 1314 Broad St, Camden, South Carolina
- 1916 – David R. Coker house, 213 E Home Ave, Hartsville, South Carolina
- 1917 – First National Bank Building, (Note: A contributing property to the Downtown Gastonia Historic District, NRHP-listed in 2004.) 168 W Main Ave, Gastonia, North Carolina
- 1919 – St. Paul United Methodist Church, 102 E Butler Ave, Saluda, South Carolina

=== Charles C. Wilson, 1919–1923 ===
- 1919 – Joseph H. Separk house, (Note: A contributing property to the York-Chester Historic District, NRHP-listed in 2005.) 209 W Second Ave, Gastonia, North Carolina
- 1920 – Providence Methodist Church, 4833 Old State Rd, Holly Hill, South Carolina
- 1921 – Farmers Commercial Bank Building, (Note: A contributing property to the Benson Historic District, NRHP-listed in 1985.) 100 W Main St, Benson, North Carolina
- 1923 – Siler City High School (former), 101 S Third Ave, Siler City, North Carolina
- 1924 – City Hospital (former), 401 N Highland St, Gastonia, North Carolina

=== Wilson & Berryman, 1923–1924 ===
- 1923 – Braswell Memorial Library (former), 344 Falls Rd, Rocky Mount, North Carolina

=== Wilson, Berryman & Kennedy, 1924–1927 ===
- 1925 – Carroll School of Fine Arts, (Note: A contributing property to the Limestone Springs Historic District, NRHP-listed in 1986.) Limestone University, Gaffney, South Carolina
- 1925 – Hamrick Hall of Science, Limestone University, Gaffney, South Carolina
- 1925 – Sanford High School (former), 507 N Steele St, Sanford, North Carolina
- 1926 – Greenwood High School (former), 857 S Main St, Greenwood, South Carolina
- 1926 – Andrew Jackson Hotel, 223 E Main St, Rock Hill, South Carolina
- 1926 – Johnson Hall, Meredith College, Raleigh, North Carolina
- 1926 – Planters Building, (Note: A contributing property to the Lumberton Commercial Historic District, NRHP-listed in 1989.) 312 N Chestnut St, Lumberton, North Carolina
- 1928 – Halifax Medical Center, 303 N Clyde Morris Blvd, Daytona Beach, Florida

=== Charles C. Wilson, 1927–1929 ===
- 1927 – Granberry Hall, Limestone University, Gaffney, South Carolina
- 1929 – Pine Street Elementary School, (Note: Designed by Charles C. Wilson, architect, with W. Paul Wilson, associate architect.) 500 S Pine St, Spartanburg, South Carolina
- 1929 – St. Luke's Hospital, 330 Carolina Dr, Tryon, North Carolina

=== Wilson & Tatum, 1929–1933 ===
- 1932 – United States Post Office, 248 Market St, Cheraw, South Carolina
