= Zachariah Wines =

South Carolina state representative

Zacariah Wilson Wines (c. 1847–1920) was a state representative in South Carolina. A historical marker commemorates his life.

He briefly attended Calver Institute in Richmond before returning home to help his father who was struggling financially.

Wines was a founding member and officer of Union Baptist Church organized in 1866. He taught at the Waddell School. He represented Darlington County in the South Carolina House of Representatives from 1876 to 1878. Governor Wade Hampton III commissioned him a captain in the state militia. From 1897 to 1904, during Republican presidential administrations, he served as postmaster of Society Hill.
