= City Hospital-Gaston Memorial Hospital =

Historic hospital complex in North Carolina, US

- U.S. National Register of Historic Places
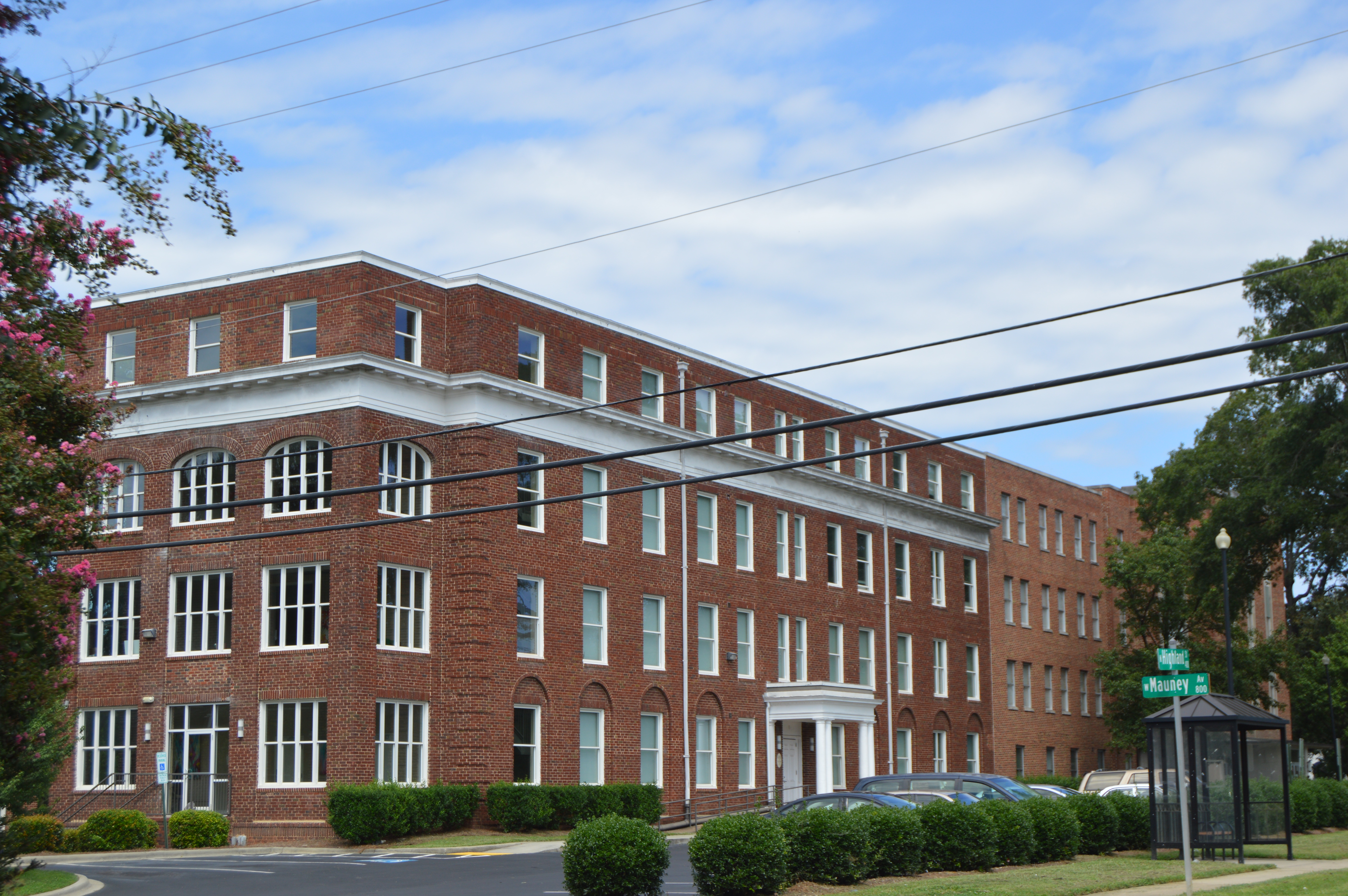
- Eastern side

- Location within North Carolina Location within the United States
- Location: 401-405 N. Highland St., 810 W. Mauney Ave., Gastonia, North Carolina
- Coordinates: 35°16′10″N 81°11′41″W
- Area: 2.49 acres (1.01 ha)
- Built: 1924, 1947, 1951, 1957
- Architect: Charles Coker Wilson (1924 building); Walter Hook and Associates (1951 building)
- Architectural style: Classical Revival
- NRHP reference No.: 11000889
- Added to NRHP: December 7, 2011

City Hospital-Gaston Memorial Hospital is a historic hospital complex located at Gastonia, Gaston County, North Carolina. The complex consists of: the 1924 Classical Revival-style City Hospital designed by architect Charles Coker Wilson; the 1951 Gaston Memorial Hospital; the 1957 addition that connects them; and a 1947 nurses’ school and dormitory. The original section is a four-story, 12 bay by 3 bay, brick building.

It was listed on the National Register of Historic Places in 2011.
