= First Presbyterian Church (Rock Hill, South Carolina) =

Historic church in South Carolina, United States

- U.S. National Register of Historic Places
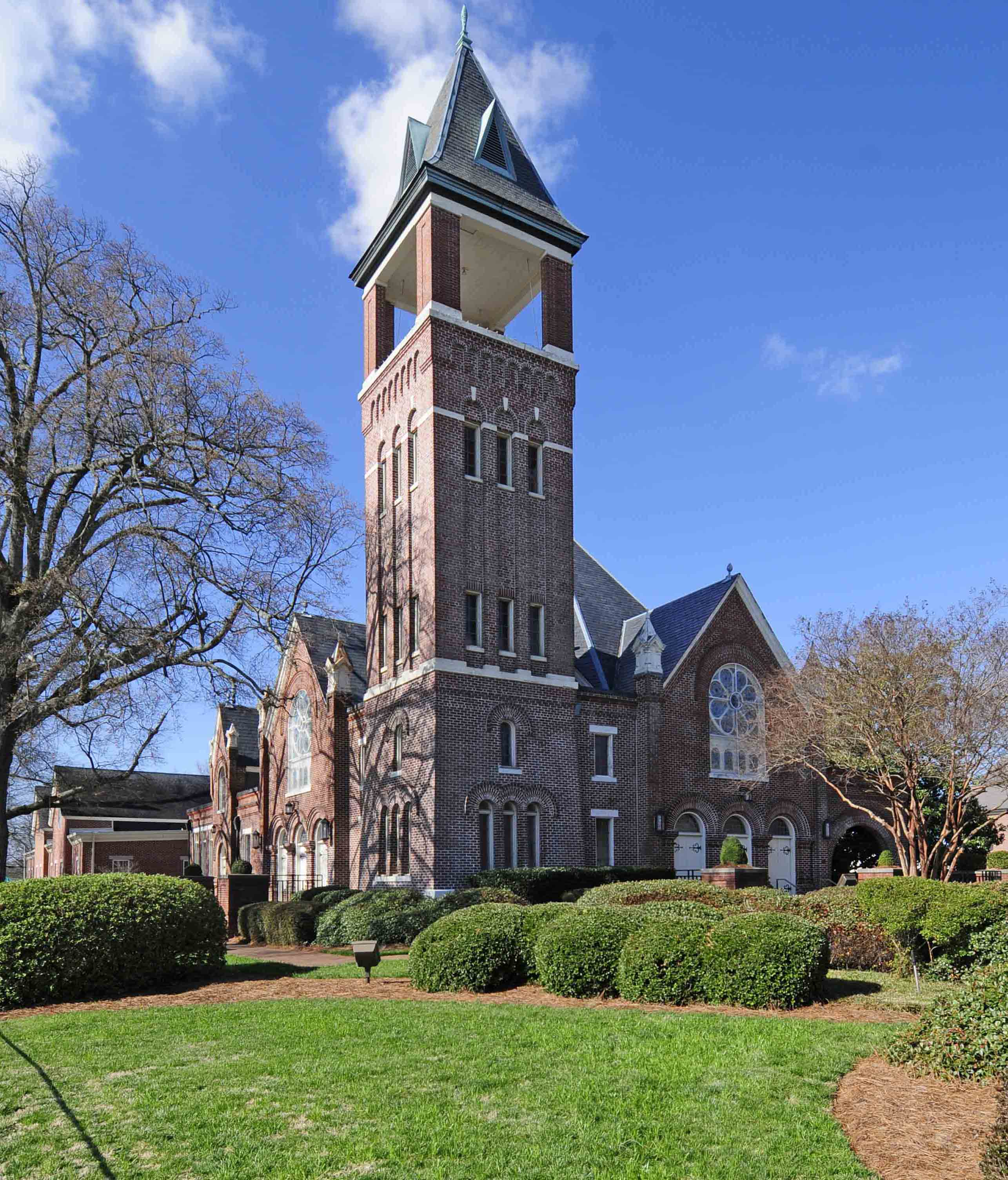

- Location within South Carolina Location within the United States
- Location: 234 E. Main St., Rock Hill, South Carolina
- Coordinates: 34°55′25″N 81°1′31″W
- Area: 1.8 acres (0.73 ha)
- Built: 1894
- Architect: Wilson, Charles Coker; et al.
- Architectural style: Late Victorian
- MPS: Rock Hill MPS
- NRHP reference No.: 92000653
- Added to NRHP: June 10, 1992

First Presbyterian Church is a historic church at 234 E. Main Street in Rock Hill, South Carolina.

It was designed by Charles Coker Wilson and was built in 1894. It was added to the National Register in 1992.
