= Logan Elementary School =

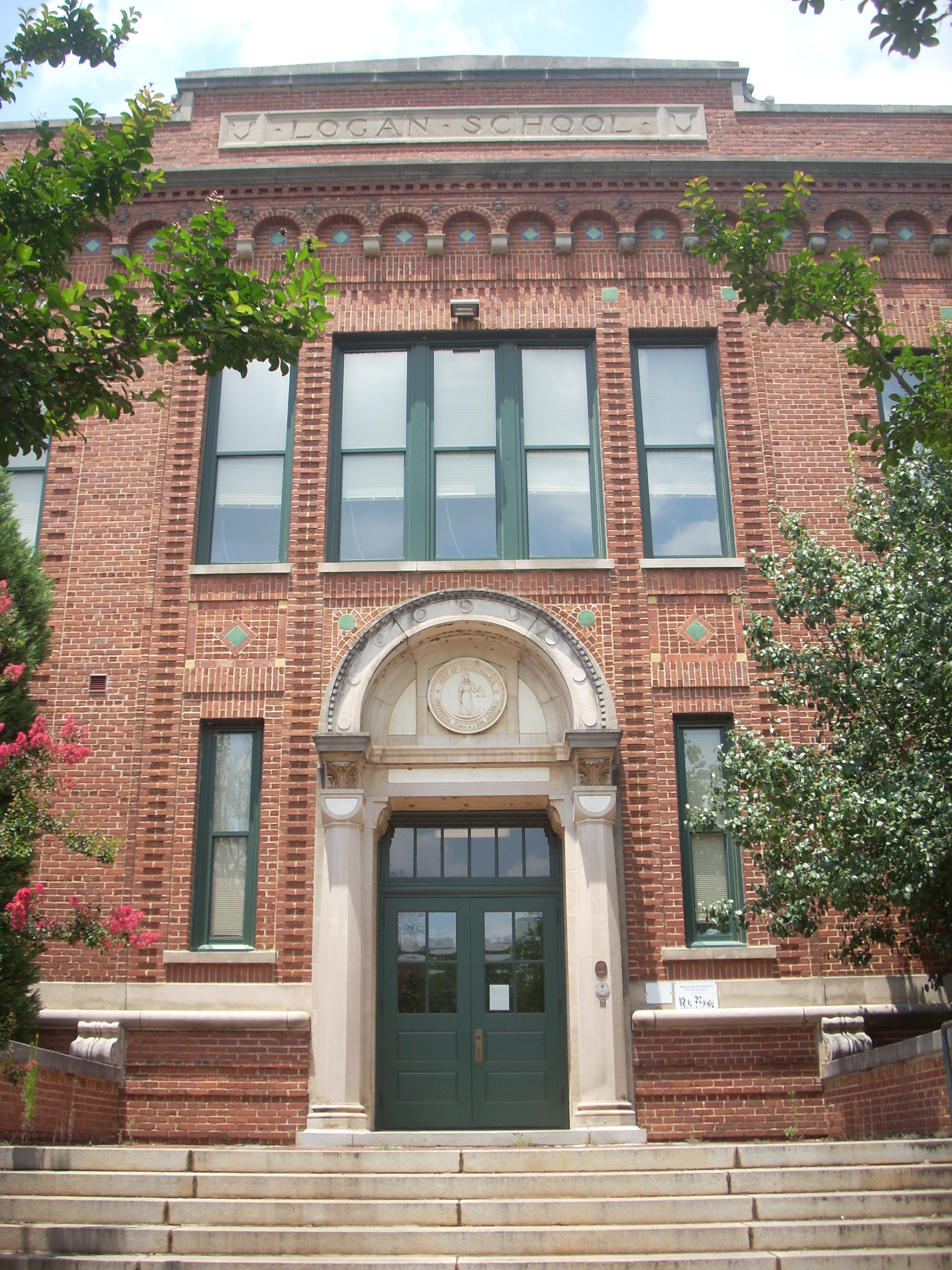

Location
- 1815 Elmwood Avenue; Columbia, South Carolina; United States; 34°0′43″N 81°2′42″W

Information
- Type: Public elementary school
- Established: 1913
- School district: Richland County School District One
- Principal: Richard Moore (Christopher Richards principal starting '15-'16) David Copeland (current)
- Grades: Pre-K–5
- Enrollment: 296
- Website: logan.richlandone.org
- Logan School
- U.S. National Register of Historic Places
- Location within South Carolina Location within the United States
- Area: 4 acres (1.6 ha)
- Built: 1913
- Architect: Charles Coker Wilson; Wilson & Sompayrac
- Architectural style: Italian Renaissance
- MPS: Columbia MRA
- NRHP reference No.: 79003367
- Added to NRHP: March 2, 1979

Logan Elementary School is a public elementary school in Columbia, South Carolina. It was built in 1913. The building was listed on the U.S. National Register of Historic Places in 1979.
