= J. L. Coker Company Building =

Historic commercial building in South Carolina, US

- J.L. Coker Company Building
- U.S. National Register of Historic Places
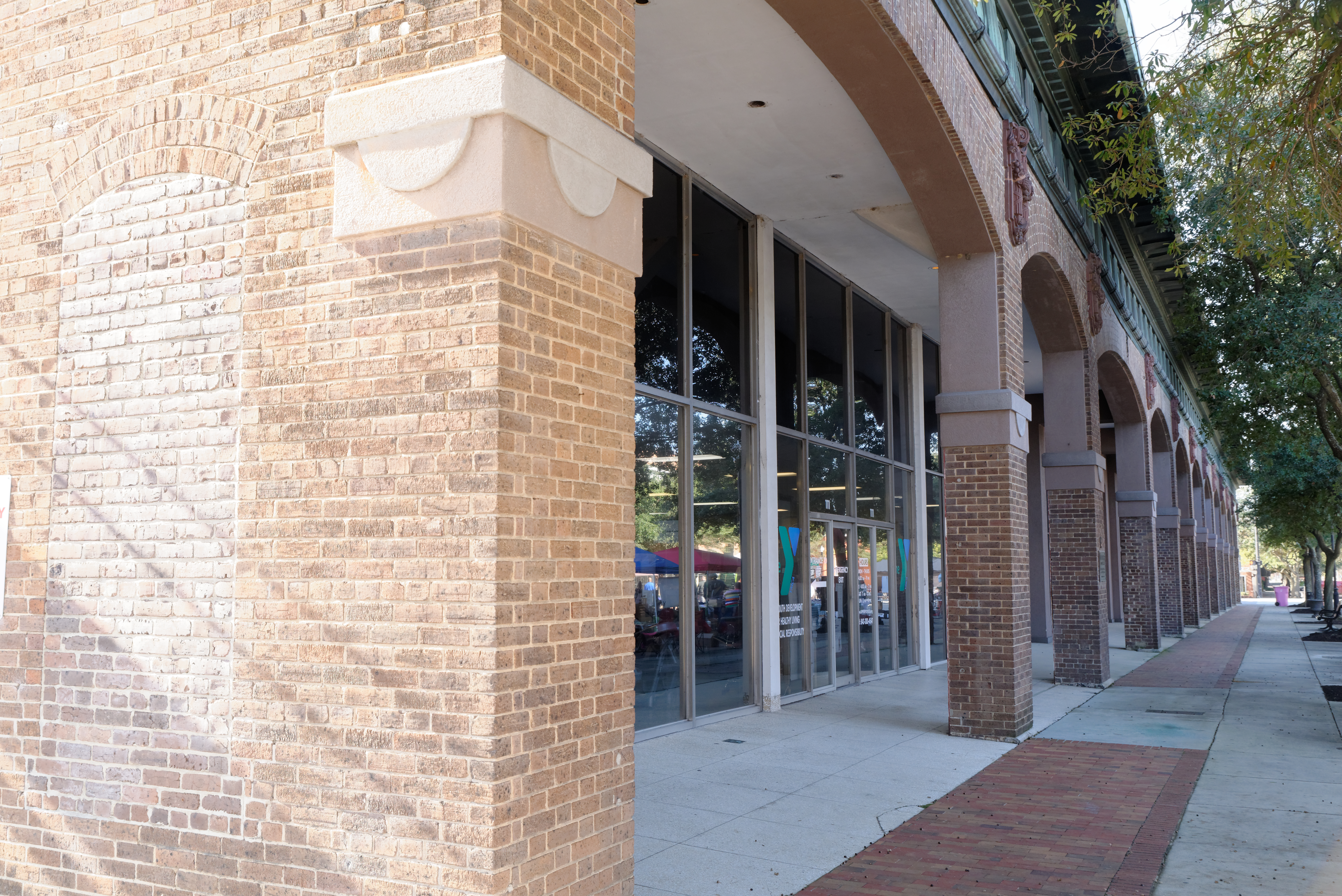

- Location within South Carolina Location within the United States
- Location: 5th St. and Carolina Ave., Hartsville, South Carolina
- Coordinates: 34°22′27″N 80°4′22″W
- Area: 1 acre (0.40 ha)
- Built: 1909-1910
- Architect: Wilson, Charles Coker
- NRHP reference No.: 83002192
- Added to NRHP: February 9, 1983

J.L. Coker Company Building is a historic commercial building located at Hartsville, Darlington County, South Carolina. It was designed by Charles Coker Wilson and built in 1909–1910. It is a one-story, 11-bay, brick building with a brick warehouse addition. The building covers an area of approximately one acre. The façade consists of an arcade whose segmental arches enclose the display bays and entrances. It was built for the company founded by Major James Lide Coker. It is currently the home of the Hartsville YMCA.

It was listed on the National Register of Historic Places in 1983.
