= Japonica Hall =

Historic house in South Carolina, United States

- U.S. National Register of Historic Places
- Location within South Carolina Location within the United States
- Location: S. Main St., Society Hill, South Carolina
- Coordinates: 34°30′21″N 79°51′35″W
- Area: 4.9 acres (2.0 ha)
- Built: 1897
- Architect: Wilson, Charles Coker
- Architectural style: Beaux Arts, American Renaissance
- NRHP reference No.: 89002153
- Added to NRHP: December 21, 1989

Japonica Hall, also known as the Major J.J. Lucas House, is a historic home located at Society Hill, Darlington County, South Carolina. It was built in 1896–1897, and is a 2 1/2-story over basement brick residence with a rusticated first story and a second story. It is in the Beaux Arts style with a facade reminiscent of Italian Renaissance palazzos. It has a projecting hipped-roof central entrance bay and a one-story Tuscan order verandah. It was the home of Major James Jonathan Lucas, a prominent local railroad builder and businessman. Lucas, who represented Charleston in the state House of Representatives from 1856 to 1862, was a prominent Confederate artillery officer in the defense of Charleston during the American Civil War.

It was listed on the National Register of Historic Places in 1989. It is located in the Welsh Neck-Long Bluff-Society Hill Historic District.
