= Providence Methodist Church =

Historic church in South Carolina, United States

- U.S. National Register of Historic Places
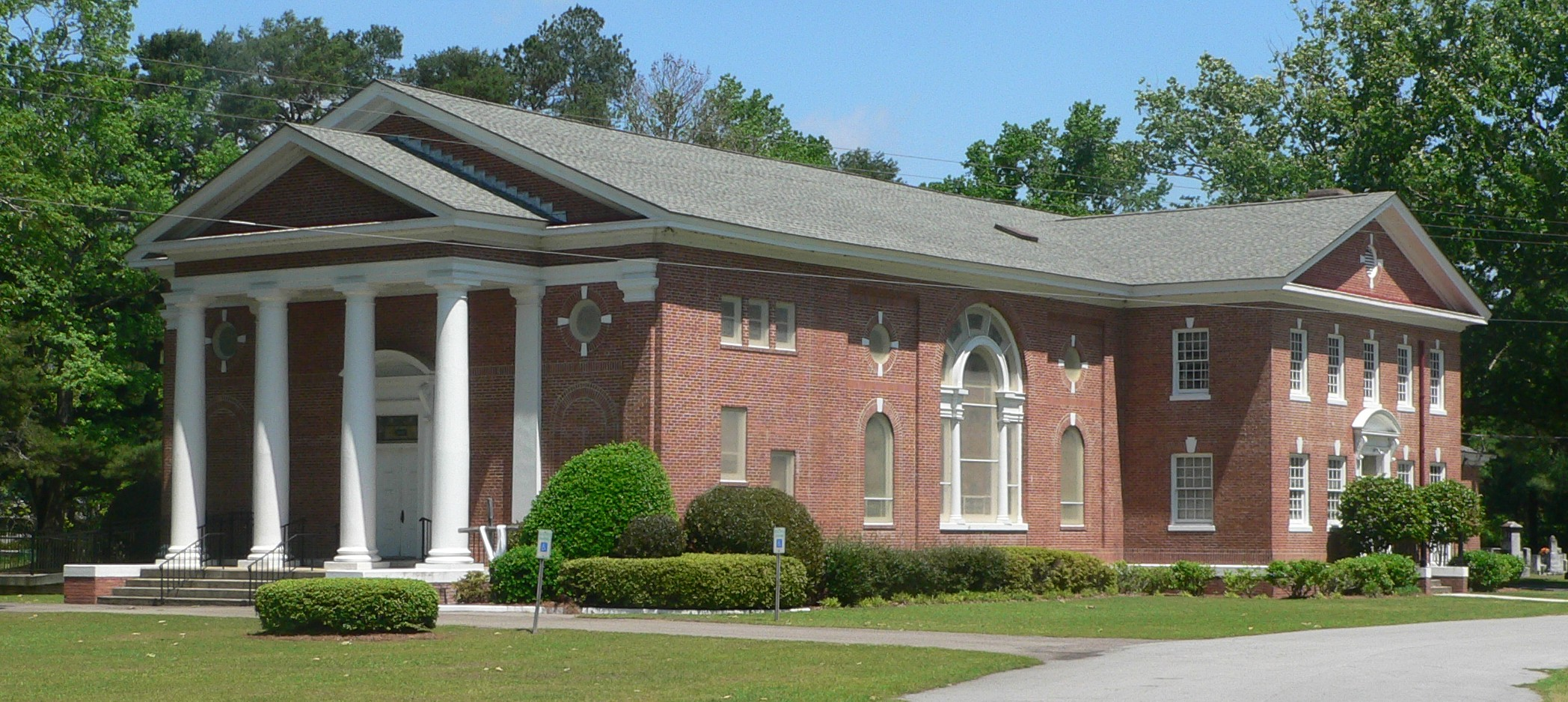

- Location within South Carolina Location within the United States
- Location: 4833 Old State Rd., Holly Hill, South Carolina
- Coordinates: 33.392529°N 80.540493°W
- Area: 5 acres (2.0 ha)
- Built: 1919-1920
- Architect: Wilson, Charles Coker; Spencer, G.W.
- Architectural style: Classical Revival
- NRHP reference No.: 08001395
- Added to NRHP: September 25, 2009

Providence Methodist Church, also known as Providence United Methodist Church, is a historic Methodist church located at Holly Hill, Orangeburg County, South Carolina, USA. It was designed by the architect Charles Coker Wilson and built in 1919–1920. It consists of a sanctuary and rear educational/administrative wings in a modified cruciform plan. The front facade features a Neoclassical central tetrastyle portico with simplified Roman Doric order limestone columns, pilasters and entablature. It also features large stained glass Palladian windows. Also on the property is the contributing church cemetery.

It was added to the National Register of Historic Places in 2009.
