= Julius Harder =

American architect

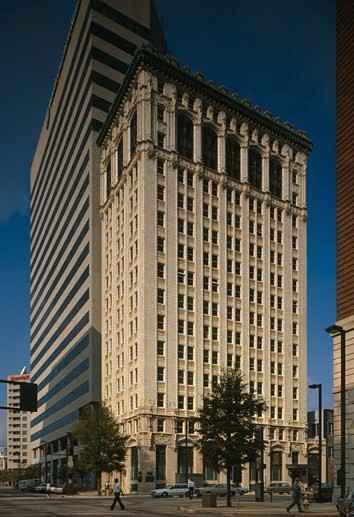
Palmetto Building

Julius F. Harder was born December 3, 1865, in Connecticut. He was an American architect based in New York City and was a principal in the firm Isreals & Harder (the successor to Marsh, Isreals & Harder). Before starting his own firm with Charles Henry Israels (1865–1911), Harder had worked for architect John Rochester Thomas.

He designed the Palmetto Building, a skyscraper built during 1912-1913 that was then the tallest building in the state of South Carolina. The building's construction was supervised by local architects Wilson & Sompayrac.

He designed the award-winning Samuel Hahnemann Monument, Reservation 64, Massachusetts & Rhode Island Aves. at Scott Cir. NW Washington, DC (Harder, Julius F.), NRHP-listed

He served as treasurer of the Architectural League of America at its fifth annual convention.

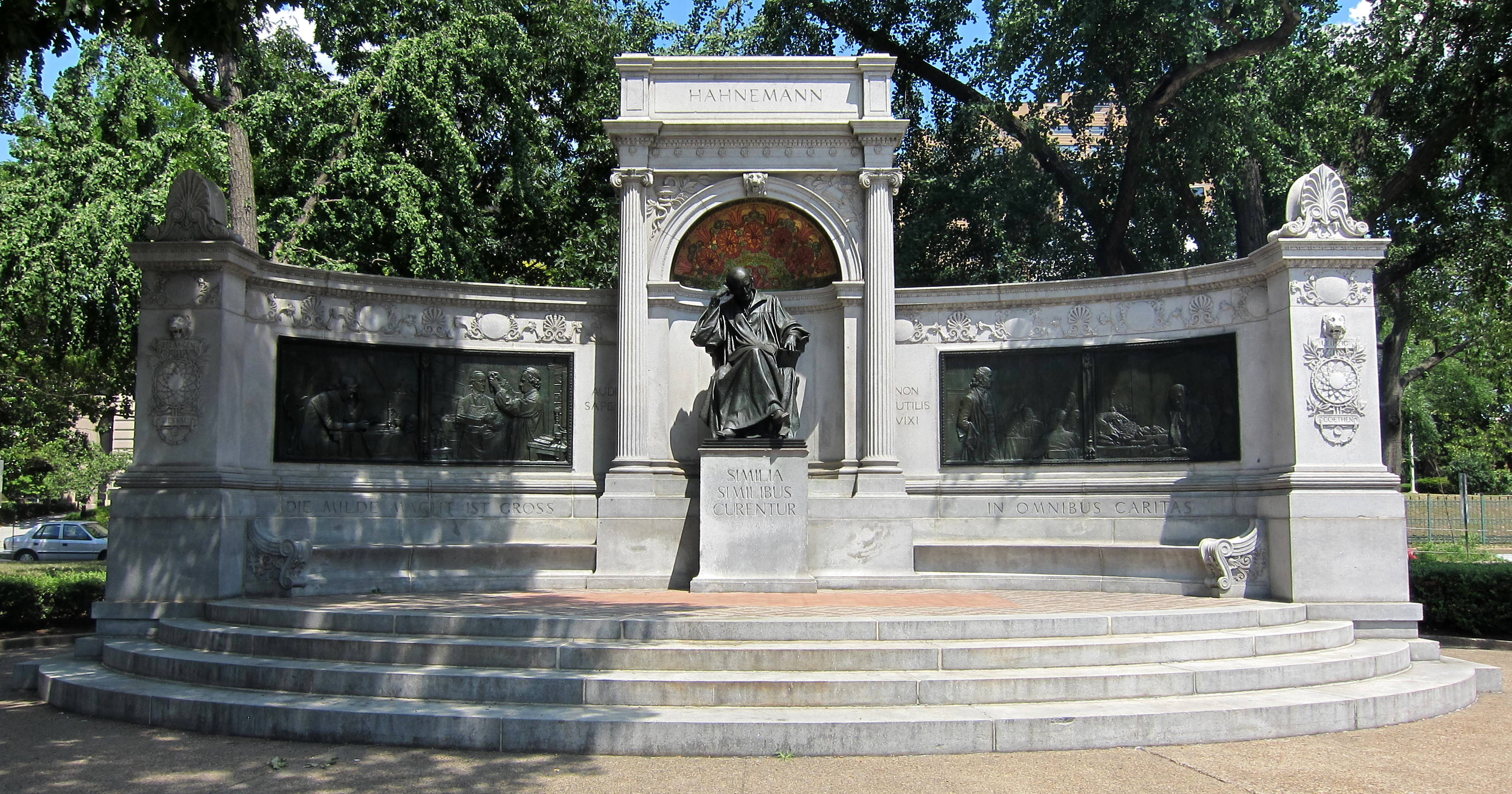
Samuel Hahnemann Monument, Washington, D.C.

In 1893, he married Olga S. Kall, in Manhattan (New York City), New York. They had two sons, Hubert and George.

Harder died after experiencing a heart attack on November 20, 1930.

== Partial Work List ==
- 1900 Samuel Hahnemann Monument, Reservation 64, Scott Circle, Washington, D.C.
- 1902-04 Hudson Theater (exterior and interior), 139-141 West 44th Street, New York, NY (with J. B. McElfatrick)
- 1905 Edward Thaw House, 4 East 80th Street, New York, NY - demolished c.1929
- 1905 Apartment House, West 46th Street, New York, NY
- 1912-13 Palmetto Building
