= Palmetto Building =

Early skyscraper in Columbia, South Carolina

- U.S. National Register of Historic Places
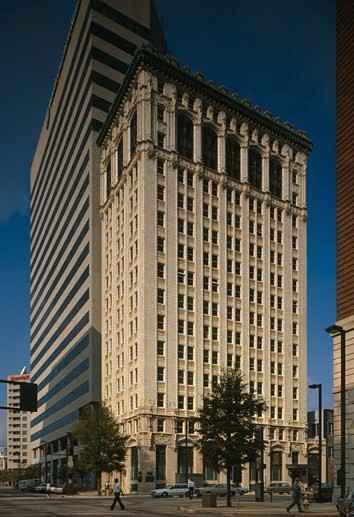

- Location within South Carolina Location within the United States
- Location: 1400 Main St., Columbia, South Carolina
- Coordinates: 34°0′14″N 81°2′5″W
- Area: 0.1 acres (0.040 ha)
- Built: 1913
- Architect: Julius Harder
- Architectural style: Skyscraper
- NRHP reference No.: 80003696
- Added to NRHP: November 25, 1980

The Palmetto Building, built during 1912–1913, is an early skyscraper in Columbia, South Carolina. It was designed by architect Julius Harder, and Wilson and Sompayrac served as supervising architects. Upon completion it was the tallest building in South Carolina at 215 ft (66 m) and with 15 floors.

The Palmetto Building was listed on the National Register of Historic Places in 1980. Since the mid-2000s, it has housed the Sheraton Columbia Downtown Hotel.

It was important in the architectural career of Charles Coker Wilson, establishing his credentials for steel frame skyscraper construction.

== See also ==
- List of tallest buildings in Columbia, South Carolina
