= Lydia Plantation =

- U.S. National Register of Historic Places
- U.S. Historic district
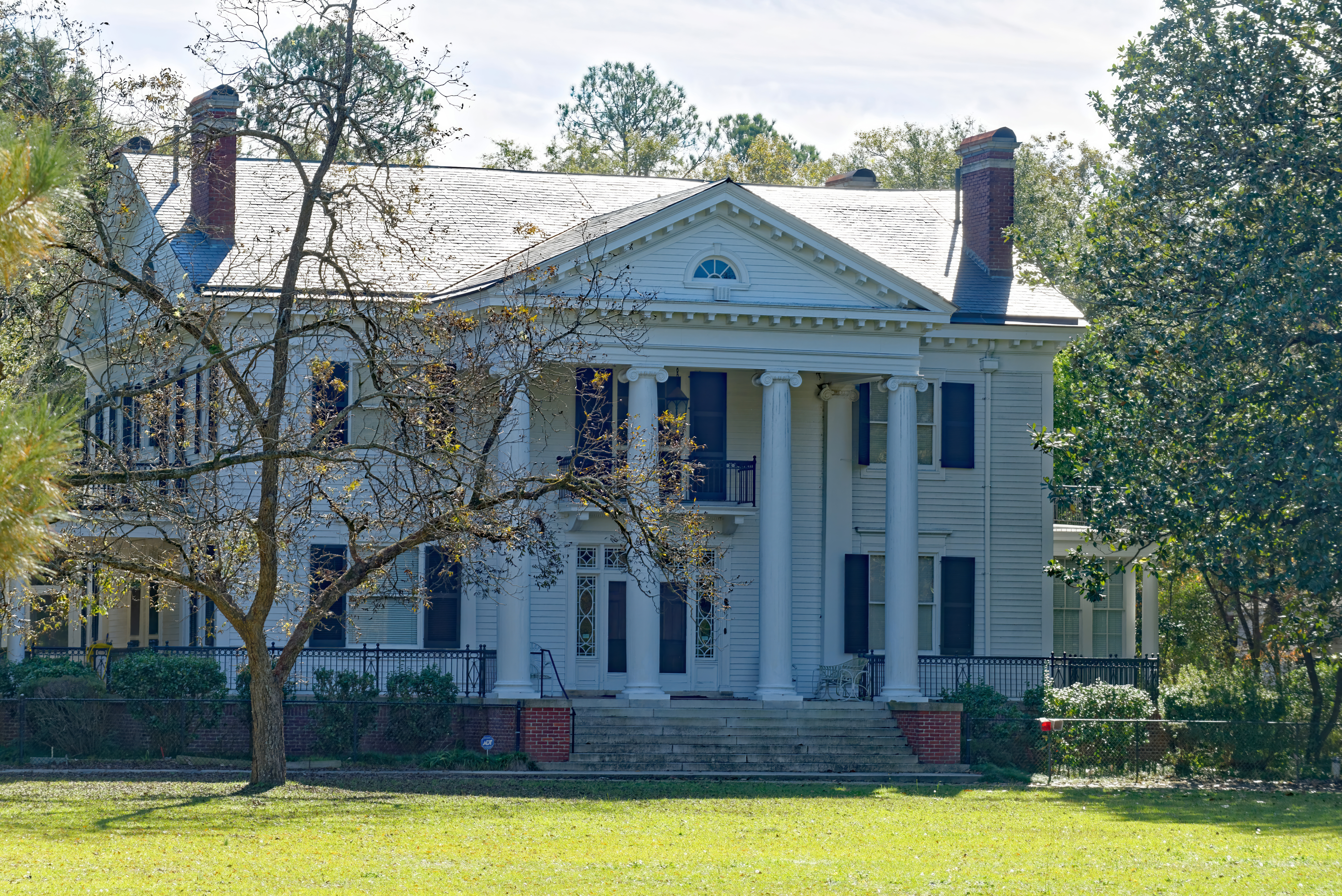

- Location within South Carolina Location within the United States
- Location: 703 W Lydia Hwy (US HWY 15/SC HWY 34), Lydia, South Carolina
- Coordinates: 34°17′28″N 80°6′18″W
- Area: 16.2 acres (6.6 ha)
- Built: 1850
- Architect: Wilson, Sompayrac & Urquhart; Wilson, Charles Coker
- Architectural style: Octagon Mode, Classical Revival
- NRHP reference No.: 10000299
- Added to NRHP: May 28, 2010

The Lydia Plantation, also known as the Benjamin Sydney Josey Farm, in Lydia, South Carolina is a historic plantation and house. The house was designed by Charles Coker Wilson and his firm Wilson, Sompayrac & Urquhart. It was built in 1910 and expanded in 1920.

A 16.2-acre (6.6 ha) area including the plantation house was listed as a historic district on the U.S. National Register of Historic Places in 2010. It is listed for its architecture and/or engineering. The listing includes 16 contributing buildings, one additional contributing site and one additional contributing structure.

A sixteen-sided office and two octagonal farm buildings are included in the property.
