= Pine Street Elementary School =

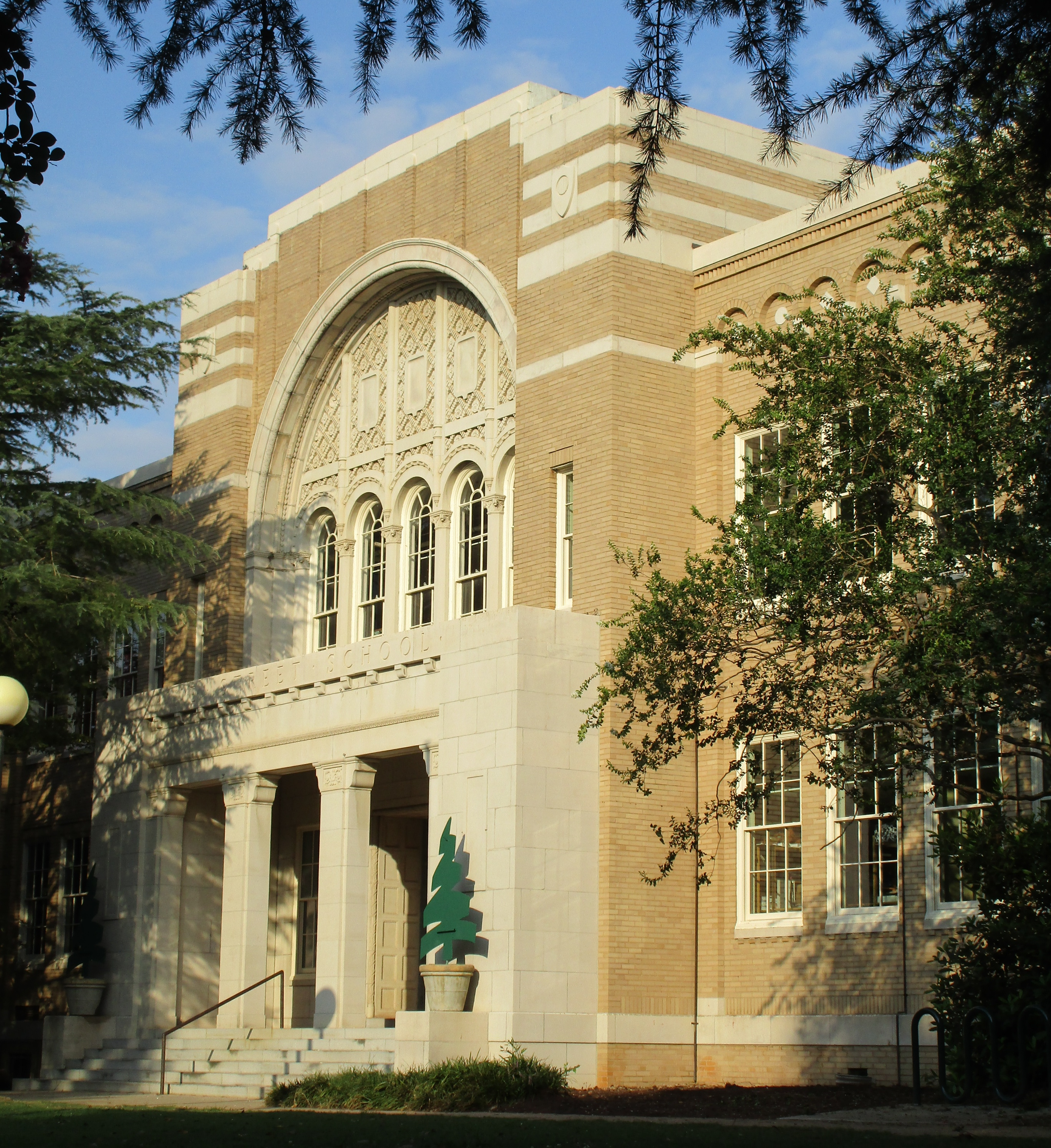
- Pine Street School, Boyd St. entrance in August 2017

Location
- 500 South Pine Street; Spartanburg, South Carolina; United States; 34°56′39″N 81°54′38″W

Information
- Type: Public coeducational elementary
- Motto: "Excellence Is Expected, And Is Our Standard"
- Opened: 1929
- School district: Spartanburg County School District 7
- Principal: Dennis Regnier
- Faculty: 80
- Grades: K - 5
- Enrollment: 648
- Colors: Navy, Green and White
- Website: pinestreet.spart7.org
- Pine Street School
- U.S. National Register of Historic Places
- Built: 1928, 1956
- Architect: Charles Coker Wilson, W. Paul Williams
- Architectural style: Beaux-Arts
- NRHP reference No.: 16000731
- Added to NRHP: October 17, 2016

Pine Street Elementary School is a public elementary school located at 500 South Pine Street in Spartanburg, South Carolina. It serves children from kindergarten through fifth grade and is part of Spartanburg County School District 7. Its school building, constructed in 1928–29, is a prominent local example of Beaux Arts architecture, and was listed on the National Register of Historic Places in 2016. It is the oldest continuously operating school in Spartanburg County.

== ODYSSEY ==
Pine Street Elementary is part of District 7's ODYSSEY program for gifted and talented students.

== Awards ==
- Recipient of the South Carolina Palmetto Gold Award annually since 2002

== See also ==
- National Register of Historic Places listings in Spartanburg County, South Carolina
