= Ebenezer Lutheran Chapel =

- U.S. National Register of Historic Places
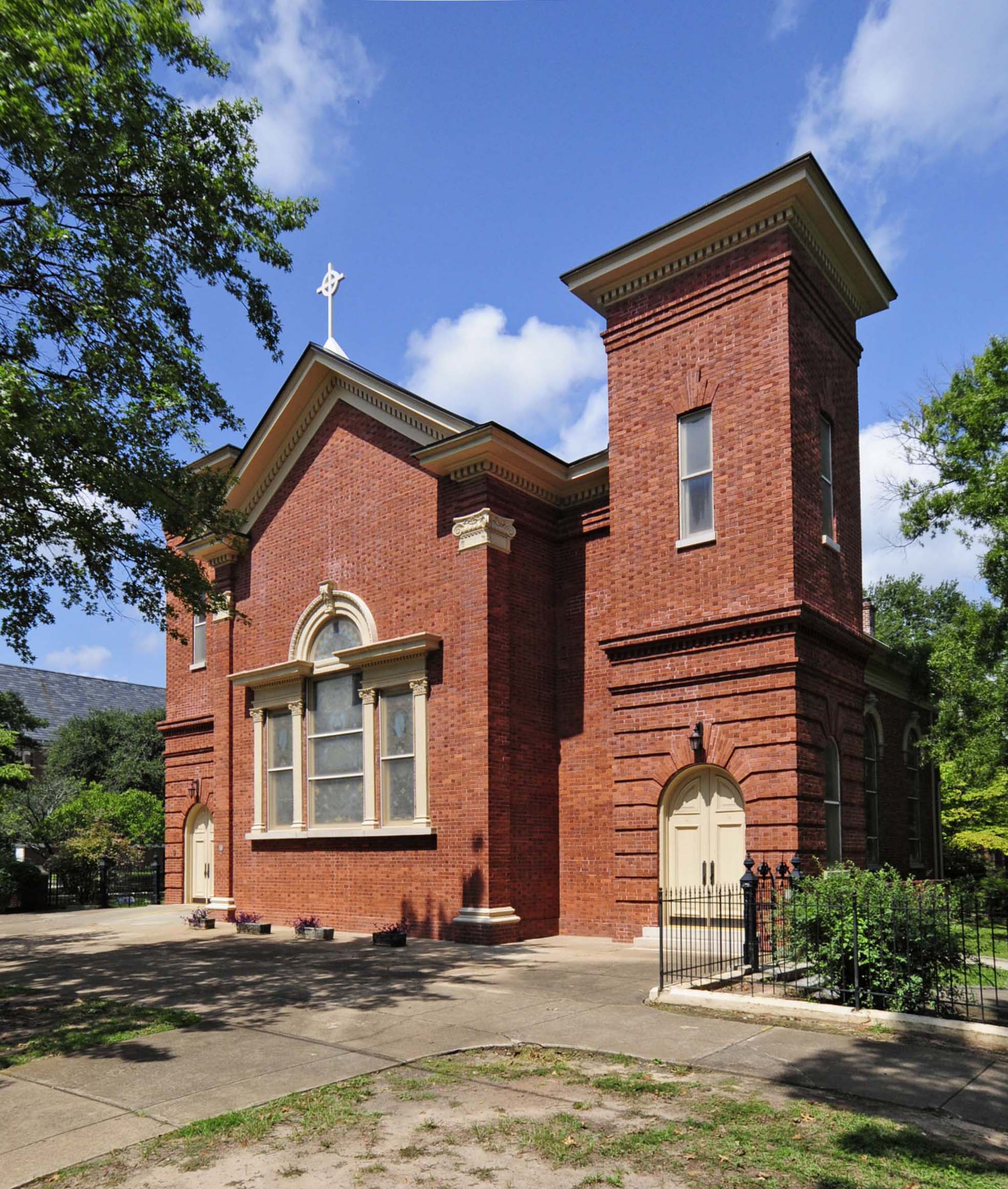
- Ebenezer Lutheran Church, September 2012

- Location within South Carolina Location within the United States
- Location: 1301 Richland St., Columbia, South Carolina
- Coordinates: 34°0′41″N 81°2′9″W
- Area: 2.2 acres (0.89 ha)
- Built: 1830, 1870 (rebuilt)
- Architect: Gustav Theodore Berg; Wilson & Edwards
- Restored: 1993
- MPS: Columbia MRA
- NRHP reference No.: 79003365
- Added to NRHP: March 2, 1979

Ebenezer Lutheran Chapel is a historic Lutheran chapel located in Columbia, South Carolina. It was built in 1830, and rebuilt in 1870, while the restoration took place in 1993 and is a brick church that was extensively renovated in 1900. The front façade features two square towers and finely detailed art glass windows. Adjacent to the church is a Lutheran cemetery which dates to the early 1800s.

It was added to the National Register of Historic Places in 1979.
