= Bouchier Building =

- Building at 1722–1724 Main Street
- U.S. National Register of Historic Places
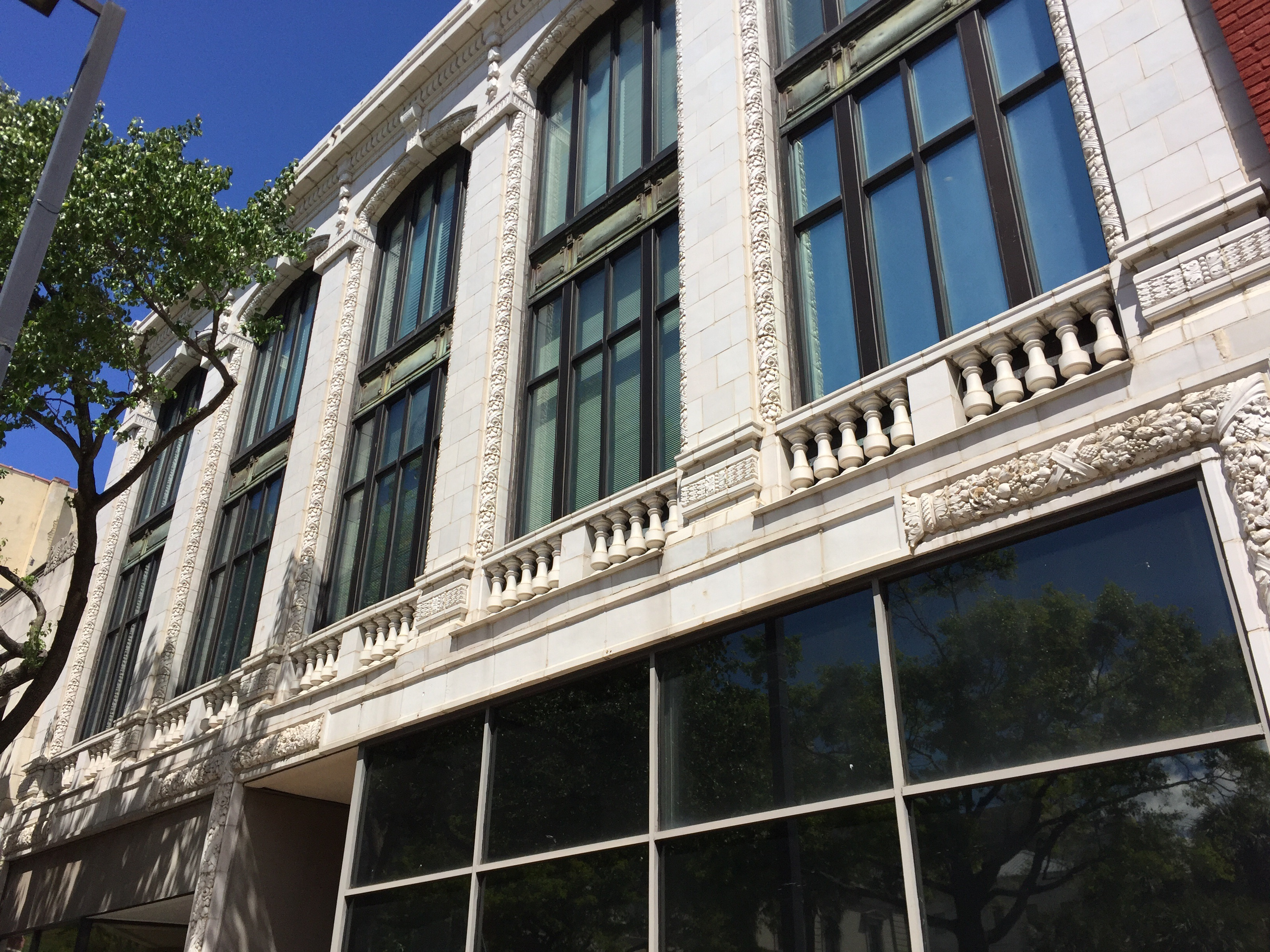

- Location within South Carolina Location within the United States
- Location: 1722–1724 Main St., Columbia, South Carolina
- Coordinates: 34°0′30″N 81°2′13″W
- Area: 0.3 acres (0.12 ha)
- Built: 1912–1913
- MPS: Columbia MRA
- NRHP reference No.: 80003694
- Added to NRHP: November 25, 1980

The Bouchier Building is a historic commercial building located in Columbia, South Carolina. It was built in 1913–14, and is a three-story, terra cotta faced building with large areas of glass on the upper floors.

It was added to the National Register of Historic Places as the Building at 1722–1724 Main Street in 1979.
