= Lydia, South Carolina =

- Census-designated place
- Location within South Carolina
- Coordinates: 34°17′08″N 80°07′26″W
- Country: United States
- State: South Carolina
- County: Darlington

Area
  - Total: 2.64 sq mi (6.85 km^{2})
  - Land: 2.64 sq mi (6.85 km^{2})
  - Water: 0 sq mi (0.00 km^{2})
- Elevation: 207 ft (63 m)

Population (2020)
  - Total: 572
  - Density: 216.4/sq mi (83.56/km^{2})
- Time zone: UTC-5 (Eastern (EST))
  - Summer (DST): UTC-4 (EDT)
- ZIP code: 29079
- FIPS code: 45-43135
- GNIS feature ID: 2629835

Lydia (formerly Mount Elon) is an unincorporated community and census-designated place (CDP) in Darlington County, South Carolina, United States. As of the 2010 census, the population of the CDP was 642. It is the location of Lydia Plantation, which is listed on the U.S. National Register of Historic Places.

Lydia is in western Darlington County, just east of the Lee County line. U.S. Route 15 passes through the community, leading northeast 7 miles (11 km) to Hartsville and southwest 10 miles (16 km) to Bishopville. South Carolina Highway 34 leads east 14 miles (23 km) to Darlington, the county seat.

== Geography ==
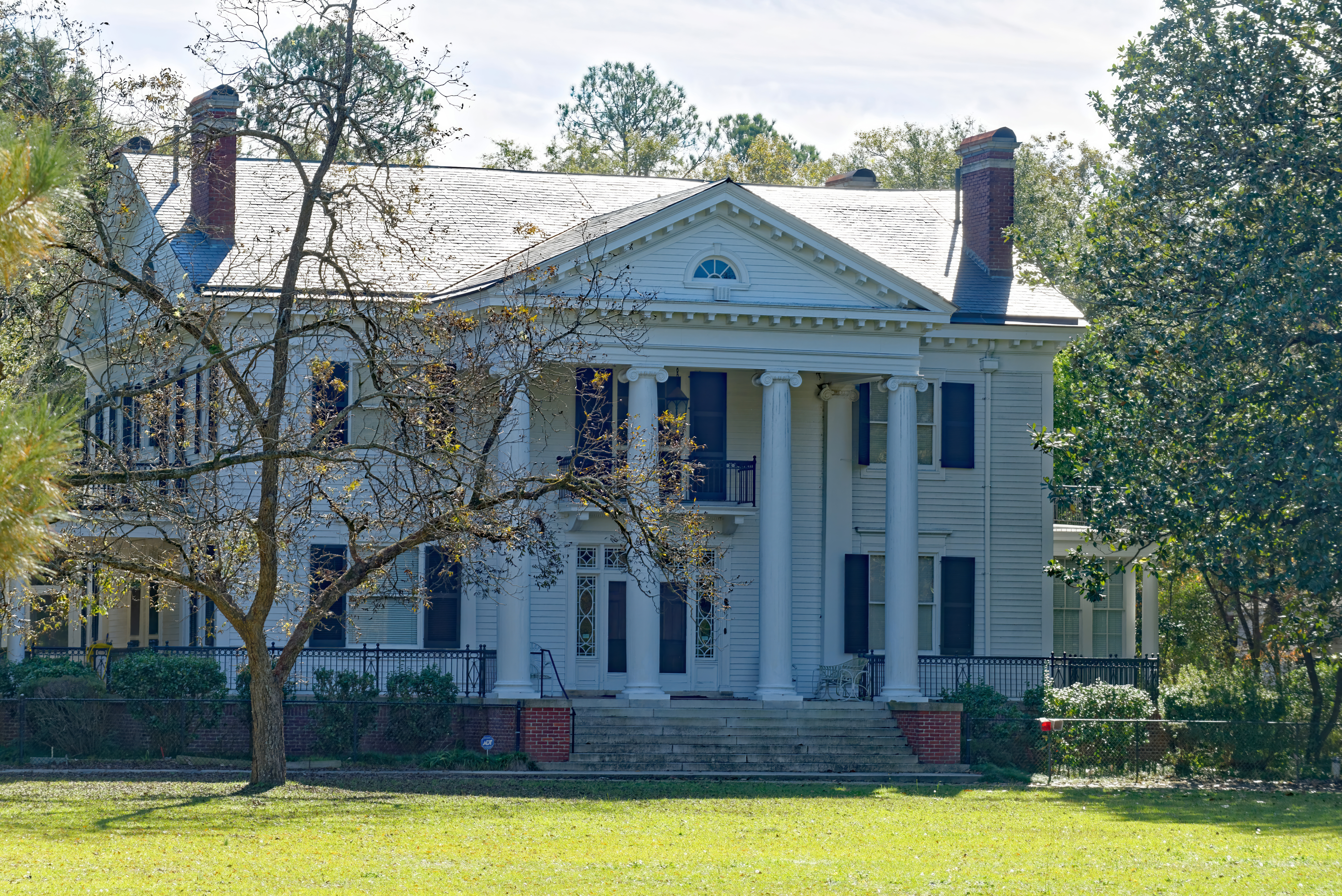
Lydia Plantation house

According to the U.S. Census Bureau, the Lydia CDP has an area of 2.6 square miles (6.8 km^{2}), all land.

== Demographics ==
Historical population
| Census | Pop. | Note | %± |
|---|---|---|---|
| 2020 | 572 | | — |
U.S. Decennial Census
