= Welsh Neck–Long Bluff–Society Hill Historic District =

Historic district in South Carolina, United States

- U.S. National Register of Historic Places
- U.S. Historic district
- Location within South Carolina Location within the United States
- Location: Southwest of Bennettsville along U.S. Route 15, near Bennettsville, South Carolina
- Coordinates: 34°31′35″N 79°49′39″W
- Area: 12,447.6 acres (5,037.4 ha)
- Built: 1748
- Architectural style: Greek Revival, Second Empire, Georgian
- NRHP reference No.: 74001846
- Added to NRHP: December 16, 1974

Welsh Neck–Long Bluff–Society Hill Historic District is a national historic district located near Bennettsville, Marlboro County, South Carolina. The district encompasses 250 contributing buildings in the communities of Welsh Neck, Long Bluff, and Society Hill. The Welsh Neck community was an early religious center (a ca. 1738 Baptist church was established here) for the Pee Dee region, and Long Bluff served as a judicial center. The courthouse at Long Bluff, with its jail, tavern, and supporting buildings, was a center of activity for the Upper Pee Dee region during the Revolution. Few small communities have contributed more to the public in the way of culture, education and leadership than has Society Hill. It has numbered among its population outstanding leaders in religion and education, jurists, statesmen, soldiers, authors, and agriculturists. The Society Hill Library Society was formed in 1822. This group grew out of the St. David's Society, founded 1777 in Cheraw, which had a widespread influence and was a main factor in making Society Hill a center of intelligent leadership in the Pee Dee for a century and a half.

This is a rural community with many fine antebellum homes in the Georgian mode. Constructed on large lots or in wooden settings, many are two-storied clapboard structures with one-story front verandahs. Nineteenth century mercantile establishments still operate in unadorned frame buildings of a purely functional design. Notable buildings include the Judge Josiah H. Evans House, Enoch Hanford House, Wilson House, Welsh Neck Baptist Church and Parsonage, W. A. Carragan House, Trinity Church, Coker and Rogers Store, Old Society Hill Library, and John K. McIver House. Welsh Neck and Long Bluff, both now unoccupied wooded areas, are considered excellent potential archaeological sites.

It was listed on the National Register of Historic Places in 1974.
