= Society Hill, South Carolina =

- Town
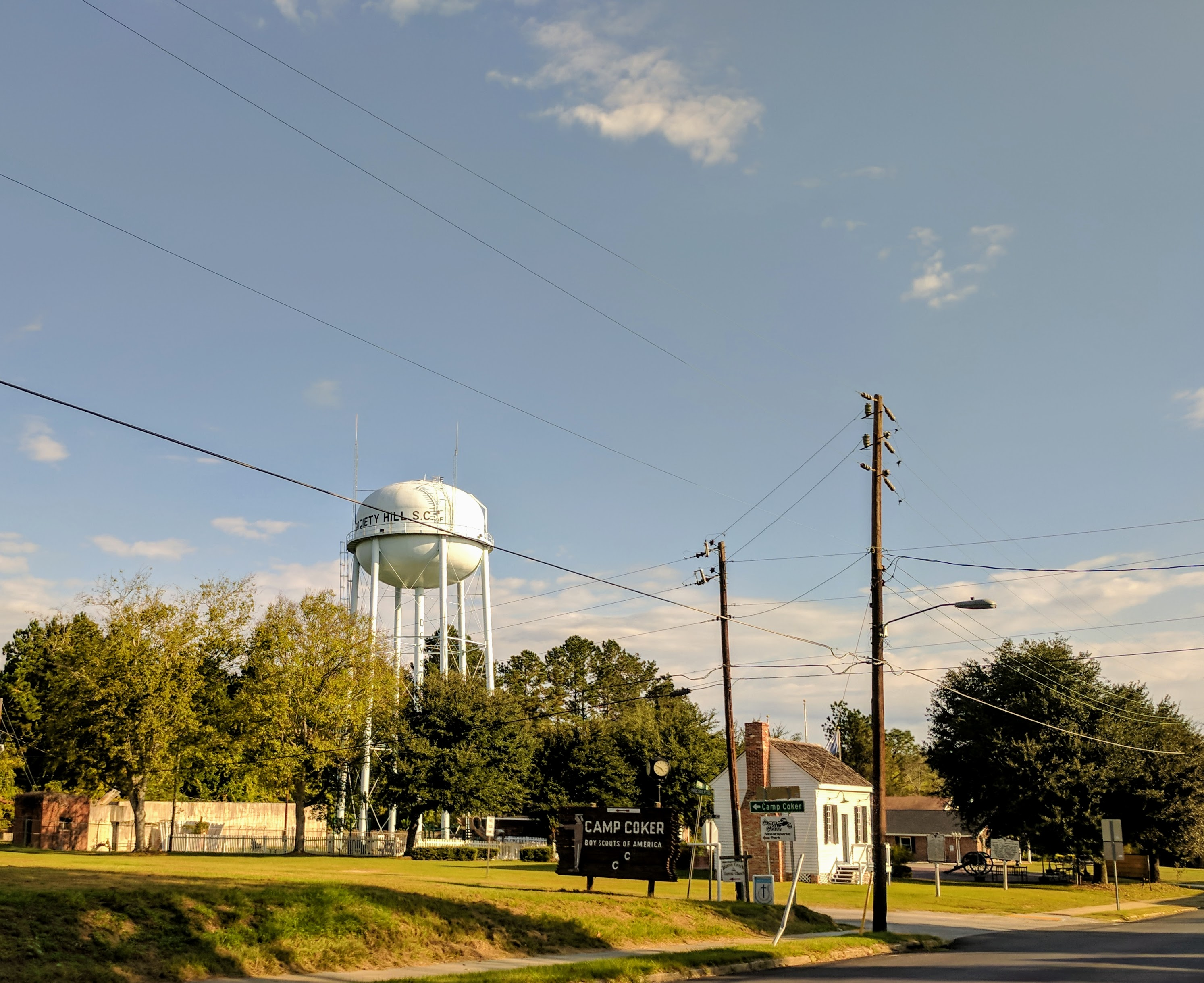
- Water tower and buildings in Society Hill

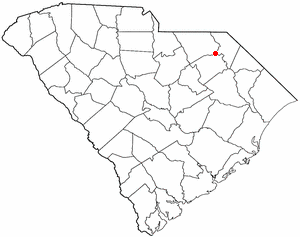
- Location of Society Hill, South Carolina
- Coordinates: 34°30′25″N 79°51′16″W
- Country: United States
- State: South Carolina
- County: Darlington

Area
  - Total: 2.15 sq mi (5.56 km^{2})
  - Land: 2.15 sq mi (5.56 km^{2})
  - Water: 0 sq mi (0.00 km^{2})
- Elevation: 157 ft (48 m)

Population (2020)
  - Total: 438
  - Density: 203.9/sq mi (78.72/km^{2})
- Time zone: UTC-5 (Eastern (EST))
  - Summer (DST): UTC-4 (EDT)
- ZIP code: 29593
- Area codes: 843, 854
- FIPS code: 45-67435
- GNIS feature ID: 2407364

Society Hill is a town in Darlington County, South Carolina, United States alongside the Pee Dee River. It is the oldest community in Darlington County and one of the first towns founded in South Carolina. The town was once the intellectual center of the Pee Dee region. However, the town's fortunes declined in the 19th century after rivers became less important as means of transportation. It is part of the Florence Metropolitan Statistical Area.

In the 2020 census, the population of Society Hill was 438, down from 563 in 2010, 700 in 2000 and 848 in 1980. Society Hill was originally settled in the 18th century by a colony of Baptists, who named the community after their "St. David's Society," the predecessor to the Society Hill Library Society.

== History ==
Welsh settlers came to the Society Hill area from Pennsylvania and Delaware in 1736. It was the first settlement in Darlington County. The Welsh settlers were Baptists and named the community after St. David's Society. The town was a center of intellectual life in the Pee Dee region in the 18th and early 19th century. St. David's Society educated leading men like James Lide Coker, founder of Sonoco and Coker University. Its library built in 1812 is the second oldest lending-library in South Carolina. A new library, a branch of the Darlington County Library System, was built in 2011.

Society Hill began to decline as rivers became less important as means of transportation. Business in the region shifted to surrounding towns such as Cheraw and Hartsville. The population of the town peaked in 1980 with around 848 people. In the 2010 census, the population of Society Hill was 563, down from 700 in 2000.

In 2017, Preservation South Carolina, a nonprofit organization, began a plan to sell eight historic buildings to preservation-minded purchasers within Society Hill. It was the organization's largest preservation effort at that time. At the time, Society Hill did not have any zoning laws to protect such buildings.

== Geography ==
Society Hill is located in northern Darlington County on high ground rising to the west of the Pee Dee River. U.S. Routes 15 and 52 pass through the town. US 15 leads northeast 12 miles (19 km) to Bennettsville and 30 miles (48 km) to Laurinburg, North Carolina, and southwest 17 miles (27 km) to Hartsville. US 52 leads north 14 miles (23 km) to Cheraw and south 16 miles (26 km) to Darlington, the county seat. The two highways merge at the north end of town and pass through it as Main Street before diverging 0.8 miles (1.3 km) southwest of the town limits.

According to the United States Census Bureau, the town has a total area of 2.2 square miles (5.7 km^{2}), all land. The Pee Dee River, which separates Darlington County from Marlboro County, is 1.4 miles (2.3 km) to the northeast of the town via US 15.

== Demographics ==
Historical population
| Census | Pop. | Note | %± |
|---|---|---|---|
| 1930 | 573 | | — |
| 1940 | 687 | | 19.9% |
| 1950 | 645 | | −6.1% |
| 1960 | 677 | | 5.0% |
| 1970 | 806 | | 19.1% |
| 1980 | 848 | | 5.2% |
| 1990 | 686 | | −19.1% |
| 2000 | 700 | | 2.0% |
| 2010 | 563 | | −19.6% |
| 2020 | 438 | | −22.2% |
U.S. Decennial Census

=== 2020 census ===
Society Hill town, South Carolina – Racial and ethnic composition Note: the US Census treats Hispanic/Latino as an ethnic category. This table excludes Latinos from the racial categories and assigns them to a separate category. Hispanics/Latinos may be of any race.
| Race / Ethnicity (NH = Non-Hispanic) | Pop 2000 | Pop 2010 | Pop 2020 | % 2000 | % 2010 | % 2020 |
|---|---|---|---|---|---|---|
| White alone (NH) | 311 | 248 | 200 | 44.43% | 44.05% | 45.66% |
| Black or African American alone (NH) | 376 | 288 | 207 | 53.71% | 51.15% | 47.26% |
| Native American or Alaska Native alone (NH) | 1 | 4 | 2 | 0.14% | 0.71% | 0.46% |
| Asian alone (NH) | 0 | 0 | 0 | 0.00% | 0.00% | 0.00% |
| Native Hawaiian or Pacific Islander alone (NH) | 0 | 0 | 0 | 0.00% | 0.00% | 0.00% |
| Other race alone (NH) | 5 | 0 | 0 | 0.71% | 0.00% | 0.00% |
| Mixed race or Multiracial (NH) | 3 | 11 | 20 | 0.43% | 1.95% | 4.57% |
| Hispanic or Latino (any race) | 4 | 12 | 9 | 0.57% | 2.13% | 2.05% |
| Total | 700 | 563 | 438 | 100.00% | 100.00% | 100.00% |

=== 2000 census ===
As of the census of 2000, there were 700 people, 269 households, and 203 families residing in the town. The population density was 320.4 inhabitants per square mile (123.7/km^{2}). There were 317 housing units at an average density of 145.1 per square mile (56.0/km^{2}). The racial makeup of the town was 44.43% White, 54.00% African American, 0.14% Native American, 0.86% from other races, and 0.57% from two or more races. Hispanic or Latino of any race were 0.57% of the population.

There were 269 households, out of which 24.5% had children under the age of 18 living with them, 52.0% were married couples living together, 19.0% had a female householder with no husband present, and 24.5% were non-families. 21.6% of all households were made up of individuals, and 7.8% had someone living alone who was 65 years of age or older. The average household size was 2.60 and the average family size was 3.03.

In the town, the population was spread out, with 22.0% under the age of 18, 9.6% from 18 to 24, 24.3% from 25 to 44, 29.3% from 45 to 64, and 14.9% who were 65 years of age or older. The median age was 40 years. For every 100 females, there were 89.7 males. For every 100 females age 18 and over, there were 90.9 males.

The median income for a household in the town was $30,057, and the median income for a family was $37,875. Males had a median income of $25,662 versus $18,516 for females. The per capita income for the town was $15,005. About 13.3% of families and 14.5% of the population were below the poverty line, including 26.9% of those under age 18 and 6.5% of those age 65 or over.

== Notables ==
The town was the birthplace of Gashouse Gang member Pat Crawford and the Oklahoma jurist Henry Marshall Furman.

The Welsh Neck-Long Bluff-Society Hill Historic District was listed on the National Register of Historic Places in 1974. Japonica Hall was listed separately in 1989.

Former Governor David Beasley was from Society Hill and represented the area in the South Carolina House of Representatives for almost twenty years.
