= Hart House =

Hart House most often refers to:

- Harthouse, a record label

Hart House may also refer to:

== In Canada ==
- Hart House (Alberta), historic house of the Hart wrestling family
- Hart House (University of Toronto), a student centre

== In the United States ==
- Wilson A. Hart House, La Junta, Colorado
- Gen. William Hart House, Old Saybrook, Connecticut
- Timothy Hart House, Southington, Connecticut
- Hart House (Taylor's Bridge, Delaware)
- Bullard-Hart House, Columbus, Georgia
- Big John Hart House, Yazoo City, Mississippi, listed on the NRHP in Yazoo County, Mississippi
- Charles Walter Hart House, Charles City, Iowa
- F. H. Hart House, Beloit, Kansas, listed on the NRHP in Mitchell County, Kansas
- John Hart House (Elizabethtown, Kentucky), listed on the NRHP in Hardin County, Kentucky
- J. Hawkins Hart House, Henderson, Kentucky
- Gen. Thomas Hart House, Winchester, Kentucky
- Hart House (Baton Rouge, Louisiana), listed on the NRHP in East Baton Rouge Parish, Louisiana
- Hart House (New Orleans, Louisiana), listed on the NRHP in Orleans Parish, Louisiana
- Hart House (Ipswich, Massachusetts), First Period colonial house at 51 Linebrook Road in Ipswich, Massachusetts
- Hart House (Lynnfield, Massachusetts)
- Rodney G. Hart House, Lapeer, Michigan
- Lovira Hart, Jr., and Esther Maria Parker Farm, Tuscola, Michigan
- Jeremiah Hart House, Portsmouth, New Hampshire
- Phoebe Hart House, Portsmouth, New Hampshire
- John Hart House (Portsmouth, New Hampshire)
- Hart-Rice House, Portsmouth, New Hampshire
- Demarest–Bloomer–Hart House, New Milford, New Jersey
- John D. Hart House, Pennington, New Jersey
- Hart-Hoch House, Pennington, New Jersey
- Hart House (Burlingham, New York)
- Hart-Cluett Mansion, Troy, New York
- Eleazer Hart House, Yonkers, New York
- Dr. Franklin Hart Farm, Drake, North Carolina
- J. Deryl Hart House, Durham, North Carolina
- Maurice Hart House, Stovall, North Carolina
- Gideon Hart House, Westerville, Ohio
- Lucy Hart House, Worthington, Ohio
- Moses and Mary Hart Stone House and Ranch Complex, Westfall, Oregon
- John L. Hart House (Hartsville, South Carolina)
- Thomas E. Hart House, and Kalmia Gardens, Hartsville, South Carolina
- John L. Hart House (Springville, South Carolina)
- Hart House (York, South Carolina)
- Meredith Hart House, Rio Vista, Texas, listed on the NRHP in Johnson County, Texas
- Thomas B. Hart House, Wauwatosa, Wisconsin

== See also ==
- John Hart House (disambiguation)
- Hart Building (disambiguation)
