= Portsmouth Parade Historic District =

- Formerly listed on the U.S. National Register of Historic Places
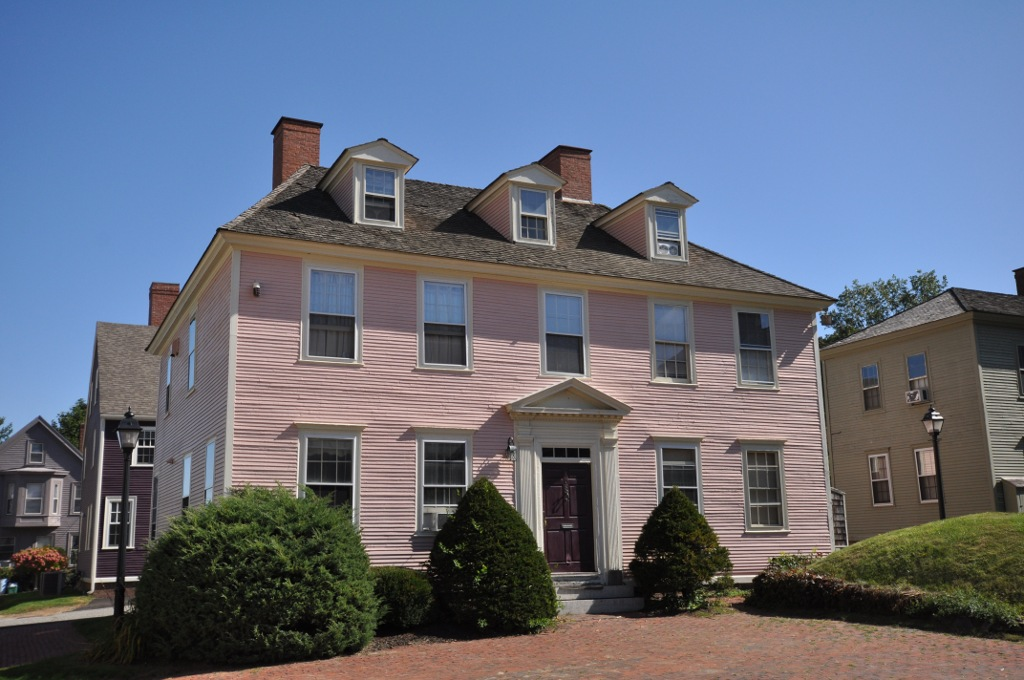
- Hart-Rice House, located within the district

- Location within New Hampshire Location within the United States
- Location: Bounded by Deer St., High St., the former location of School St., and a line running parallel to High St., Portsmouth, NH
- Coordinates: 43.07862°N 70.75997°W (Note: Coordinates in archival documents—43°04′44″N 70°45′41″W—resolve 100 yards (91 m) west of the district.)
- Architectural style: Greek Revival, Late Victorian, Federal
- NRHP reference No.: 72001570

Significant dates
- Added to NRHP: March 24, 1972
- Removed from NRHP: 1999

The Portsmouth Parade Historic District is an area in Portsmouth, New Hampshire, which was formerly listed in the National Register of Historic Places (NRHP). The district is known locally as "The Hill", a cluster of closely spaced historic houses bounded on the north by Deer Street and the east by High Street at the northern edge of downtown Portsmouth. The grouping was created by a road widening project, (Note: Archival documents more generally refer to the Vaughn Street Area Urban Renewal Project.) from houses originally located on or near Deer Street.

== History ==
Documents with the National Archives and Records Administration show that the district was nominated for inclusion to the NRHP in February 1972, at which time local authorities were "submitting funding requests to HUD, for which National Register status is a criteria." The district was added to the NRHP on March 24, 1972. The district was described as "an artificial entity created by the relocation of all but four of its fourteen buildings."

In June 1975, the nomination was returned by the Keeper of the Register, recommending that the buildings in the district be nominated individually. In December 1975, 13 of the 14 buildings were to be sold at auction, due to breach of mortgage conditions. Although the "return" of the nomination occurred in June 1975, National Park Service records indicate a de-listing date of 1999. A nearby retail and business complex was known as the Portsmouth Parade Office Center.

== Individually listed buildings ==
Multiple buildings in the district are individually listed in the NRHP:

Building	Address	NRHP listing date
Samuel Beck House	410 The Hill	April 3, 1973
Jeremiah Hart House	The Hill	November 14, 1972
John Hart House	403 The Hill	November 14, 1972
Phoebe Hart House	The Hill	April 2, 1973
Hart-Rice House	408 The Hill	August 7, 1972
James Neal House	74 Deer St.	August 7, 1972
Nutter-Rymes House	409 The Hill	November 3, 1972
Daniel Pinkham House	400 The Hill	November 3, 1972
Henry Sherburne House	62 Deer St.	August 7, 1972
Simeon P. Smith House	154 High St.	November 14, 1972
Whidden-Ward House	411 High St.	November 5, 1971

== See also ==
- National Register of Historic Places listings in Rockingham County, New Hampshire
