= John Hart House =

John Hart House or John L. Hart House may refer to:

- John Hart House (Elizabethtown, Kentucky), formerly listed on the National Register of Historic Places in Hardin County, Kentucky
- John Hart House (Portsmouth, New Hampshire), listed on the NRHP in Rockingham County, New Hampshire
- John D. Hart House, Pennington, New Jersey, listed on the NRHP in Mercer County, New Jersey
- John L. Hart House (Hartsville, South Carolina), listed on the NRHP in Darlington County, South Carolina
- John L. Hart House (Springville, South Carolina), listed on the National Register of Historic Places in Darlington County, South Carolina

== See also ==
- Hart House (disambiguation)
