= Great Cypress Swamp =

Freshwater swamp on Delmarva Peninsula, United States

Coordinates: 38°29′N 75°18′W

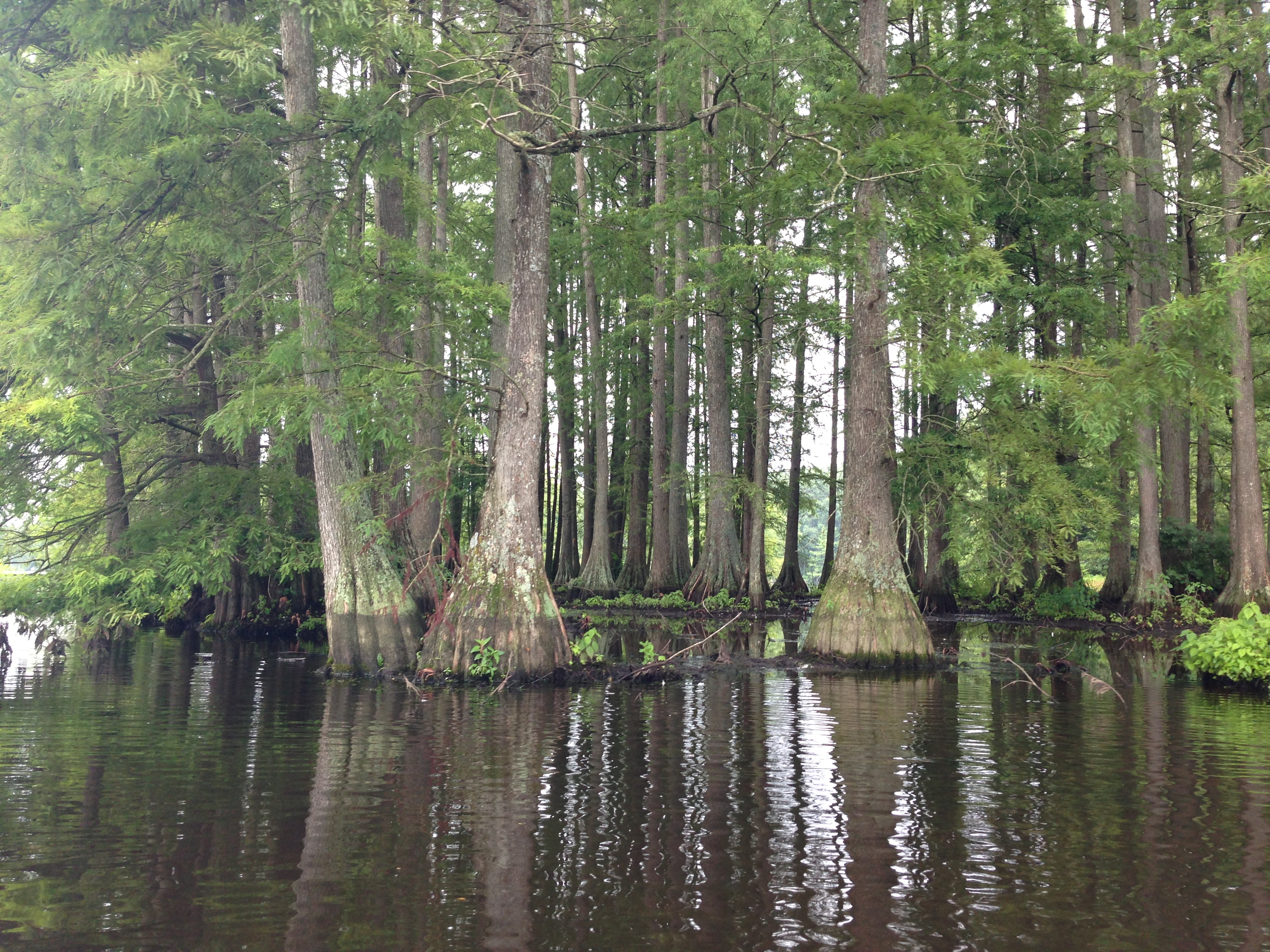
Cluster of bald cypress trees in Trap Pond State Park

The Great Cypress Swamp (also known as Burnt Swamp, Great Pocomoke Swamp, Cypress Swamp, or Big Cypress Swamp), is a forested freshwater swamp located on the Delmarva Peninsula in south Delaware and southeastern Maryland, United States. As of 2000, it is the largest contiguous forest on the Delmarva Peninsula.

It is one of the northernmost of the Bald Cypress swamps common in the southeastern United States (Battle Creek Cypress Swamp in Calvert County, Maryland is slightly further north, but much smaller). It covers about 50 square miles (130 km^{2}), mostly in southern Sussex County, Delaware. It is the source of the Pocomoke River, which flows south, and Pepper Creek, which flows northeast.

== History ==
The swamp once yielded much cypress timber. Through overharvesting and a disastrous peat fire in 1930, much of its vegetation was destroyed. One of the fires burned for eight months, leading it to be deemed the "Burnt Swamp" by local residents.

In 1980, Senator Joe Biden, at the request of environmentalists, proposed that the swamp be made into a National Park; this plan was met with resistance from local residents concerned about being overwhelmed with large numbers of visitors. When Senator Tom Carper revisited the idea of creating a national park in Delaware in 2004, the Cypress Swamp was not considered because of these concerns.

The non-profit organization Delaware Wild Lands manages the swamp and has undertaken efforts to replant bald cypress trees there.

== Ecological value ==
=== Birds ===
The swamp is home to 73 breeding species of birds. The most abundant species in the swamp are the worm-eating warbler and brown-headed cowbird. The swamp also contains two regionally rare species, Swainson's warbler and black-throated green warbler. eBird has records of at least 94 species observed in the swamp, including some found during migration which do not breed there.

== See also ==
- Pocomoke River
