= Hart Building =

Hart Building may refer to:

- Hart Building (Marysville, California), listed on the National Register of Historic Places in Yuba County, California
- Hart Building (Williamsport, Pennsylvania), listed on the National Register of Historic Places in Lycoming County, Pennsylvania
- Hart Senate Office Building, Washington, D.C.

== See also ==
- Hart House (disambiguation)
