= White Plains (Springville, South Carolina) =

Historic house in South Carolina, United States

- U.S. National Register of Historic Places
- Location within South Carolina Location within the United States
- Location: N of CR 177 and NE of CR 389, Springville, South Carolina
- Coordinates: 34°21′24″N 79°53′0″W
- Area: 3.6 acres (1.5 ha)
- Built: 1822
- Architect: Klickner, J.L.; DuBose, Isaiah
- MPS: Springville MRA
- NRHP reference No.: 85003141
- Added to NRHP: October 10, 1985

White Plains, also known as the Thomas P. Lide House and Blackmon House, is a historic home located at Springville, Darlington County, South Carolina. It was built about 1822, and is a two-story, square, frame, weatherboard-clad residence with a low-pitched hip roof. The house was substantially remodeled in about 1839 and in the late 1840s or early 1850s. Also on the property is a contributing single-pen log corn crib. Thomas Lide was one of the most active and involved members of the Springville community.

It was listed on the National Register of Historic Places in 1985.
