= Delaware Wild Lands =

American organization

- Formation: 1961
- Founder: Edmund H. "Ted" Harvey
- Type: Non-profit
- Location: 315 Taylors Bridge Road Townsend, Delaware 19734
- Website: https://dewildlands.org/

Delaware Wild Lands, Inc. is a private, tax-exempt non-profit organization dedicated to the conservation and preservation of natural areas through the acquisition and management of strategic parcels of land.

== Background ==
The organization was established in 1961 by founder and president Edmund H. "Ted" Harvey. Delaware Wild Lands' first purchase was approximately 80 acres of land surrounding Trussum Pond, in Sussex County, Delaware. In the following years, approximately 1,700 acres were acquired surrounding Trussum Pond, all of which has since been transferred to the state of Delaware, and is now part of Trap Pond State Park.

Delaware Wild Lands currently owns and manages over 19,000 acres spread across all three counties of Delaware and a small portion in Maryland.

Delaware Wild Lands' largest contiguous holding is The Great Cypress Swamp. It also manages the Sharp Farm in New Castle County and Milford Neck in Kent County. Currently, Delaware Wild Lands is engaged in active Forest Management including SFI certified sustainable timber harvest. The goal of much of this harvest is for site preparation for the restoration of Atlantic White-cedar. Delaware Wild Lands is also responsible for protecting nearly 3,500 acres of coastal marsh near Blackbird Creek from development by Shell Oil in the early 1970s.
