= Arthur Goodson House =

Historic house in South Carolina, United States

- U.S. National Register of Historic Places
- Location within South Carolina Location within the United States
- Location: W of CR 133, Springville, South Carolina
- Coordinates: 34°20′42″N 79°51′14″W
- Area: 4.6 acres (1.9 ha)
- Built: c.1850
- MPS: Springville MRA
- NRHP reference No.: 85003137
- Added to NRHP: October 10, 1985

The Arthur Goodson House, also known as the John M. Lide House, is a historic home located at Springville, Darlington County, South Carolina. It was built in the 1850s, and is a 1 1/2-story, three-bay, rectangular, central hall, weatherboard-clad, frame residence. The front façade features a full-width, hipped roof porch. Also on the property are two outbuildings: one weatherboard-clad, braced-frame building dating from the Antebellum period, and one tobacco barn constructed in the late-19th or early-20th century.

It was listed on the National Register of Historic Places in 1985.
