= Springville, South Carolina =

Coordinates: 34°20′28″N 79°51′16″W

Springville is a ghost town in Darlington County, South Carolina, United States. There was a post office in operation from 1826 until 1832.

It is the location given in the National Register of Historic Places for six places (all registered on October 10, 1985):

- Arthur Goodson House
- John L. Hart House (Springville, South Carolina)
- Evan J. Lide House
- John W. Lide House
- White Plains (Springville, South Carolina)
- Wilds Hall

== See also ==
- National Register of Historic Places listings in Darlington County, South Carolina
