= Wilds Hall =

Historic house in South Carolina, United States

- U.S. National Register of Historic Places
- Location within South Carolina Location within the United States
- Location: W of CR 228 off SC 34, Springville, South Carolina
- Coordinates: 34°19′5″N 79°50′33″W
- Area: 5.7 acres (2.3 ha)
- Built: 1839
- MPS: Springville MRA
- NRHP reference No.: 85003142
- Added to NRHP: October 10, 1985

Wilds Hall, also known as the Peter A. Wilds House and Wilson House, is a historic home located at Springville, Darlington County, South Carolina. It was built about 1839, and enlarged to its present size about 1850. It is a 2 1/2-story, rectangular, weatherboard clad, frame residence with gabled roof. It sits on a low stuccoed brick pier foundation. Also on the property are four associated outbuildings. Peter Wilds was a wealthy planter owning 111 slaves in 1860. This house was lived in by four generations of the Wilds family over a 130-year period.

It was listed on the National Register of Historic Places in 1985.
