= John W. Lide House =

Historic house in South Carolina, United States

- U.S. National Register of Historic Places
- Location within South Carolina Location within the United States
- Location: W of CR 133, Springville, South Carolina
- Coordinates: 34°21′9″N 79°51′34″W
- Area: 5 acres (2.0 ha)
- Built: c. 1835
- MPS: Springville MRA
- NRHP reference No.: 85003140
- Added to NRHP: October 10, 1985

John W. Lide House, also known as Atkinson House, is a historic home located at Springville, Darlington County, South Carolina. It was built about 1830–1840, and is a two-story, rectangular, central-hall, frame residence with a low-pitched hip roof. The house features two massive, stuccoed brick, interior chimneys. It is sheathed in weatherboard and sits on a brick pier foundation with brick fill. A full-width, one-story, hip roof porch extends across the entire façade and wraps both side elevations. Also on the property is an antebellum outbuilding.

It was listed on the National Register of Historic Places in 1985.
