= Jeremiah Hart House =

Historic house in New Hampshire, United States

- U.S. National Register of Historic Places
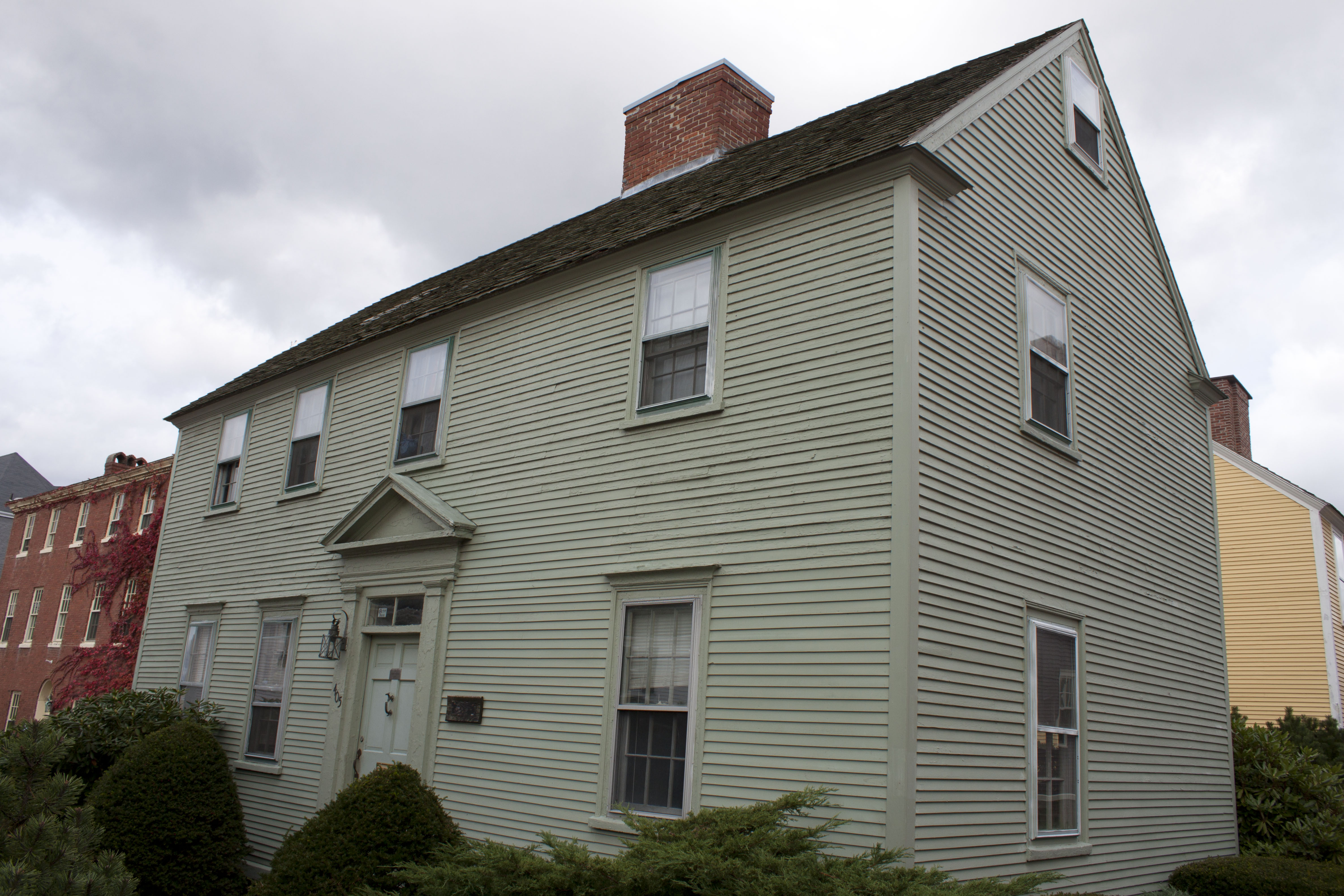

- Location within New Hampshire Location within the United States
- Location: The Hill, Portsmouth, New Hampshire
- Coordinates: 43°4′43″N 70°45′36″W
- Area: less than one acre
- Architectural style: Georgian
- NRHP reference No.: 72000081
- Added to NRHP: November 14, 1972

The Jeremiah Hart House is a historic house at The Hill in Portsmouth, New Hampshire. Probably built in the late 18th century, it is a well-preserved example of a late Georgian urban residential structure. It was originally located on Deer Street, and was moved as part of a road widening project. It was listed on the National Register of Historic Places in 1972.

== Description and history ==
The Jeremiah Hart House stands in The Hill, a cluster of closely spaced historic houses bounded on the north by Deer Street and the east by High Street at the northern edge of downtown Portsmouth. This grouping was created by a road widening project from houses originally located on or near Deer Street. This house stands near the center of the group, east of the Phoebe Hart House and north of the Hart-Rice House. It is a 2½ story wood-frame structure, with a side gable roof, clapboarded exterior, and central chimney. Its main facade is four bays wide, with asymmetrical placement of windows around a centered entrance. The entrance is the most elaborate element of the exterior, with pilasters, a transom window, entablature, and full gabled pediment. The interior of the building has a number of original features, including a narrow three-run staircase in the entrance vestibule.

This house was originally located on Deer Street, set on a narrow lot with its side facing the street. From its style it dates to the last quarter of the 18th century, and may have been built by Michael Whidden, a master builder who lived across the street from its original location. (Whidden's House was also moved onto The Hill.)

== See also ==
- National Register of Historic Places listings in Rockingham County, New Hampshire
