= Evan J. Lide House =

Historic house in South Carolina, United States

- Formerly listed on the U.S. National Register of Historic Places
- Location within South Carolina Location within the United States
- Location: W of CR 228 NW of SC 34, Springville, South Carolina
- Coordinates: 34°19′46″N 79°50′57″W
- Area: 3.7 acres (1.5 ha)
- Built: 1839
- MPS: Springville MRA
- NRHP reference No.: 85003139

Significant dates
- Added to NRHP: October 10, 1985
- Removed from NRHP: July 15, 2025

Evan J. Lide House, also known as Meade House, is a historic home located at Springville, Darlington County, South Carolina. It was built about 1839, and is a rectangular, two-story gable-roofed weatherboard-clad dwelling. It is set on a brick pier foundation and has a central hall plan. The front façade features a full-width, one-story, shed-roofed porch supported by square, solid pine posts.

It was listed on the National Register of Historic Places in 1985, and was delisted in 2025.
