= Hart House (Taylor's Bridge, Delaware) =

Historic house in Delaware, US

- U.S. National Register of Historic Places
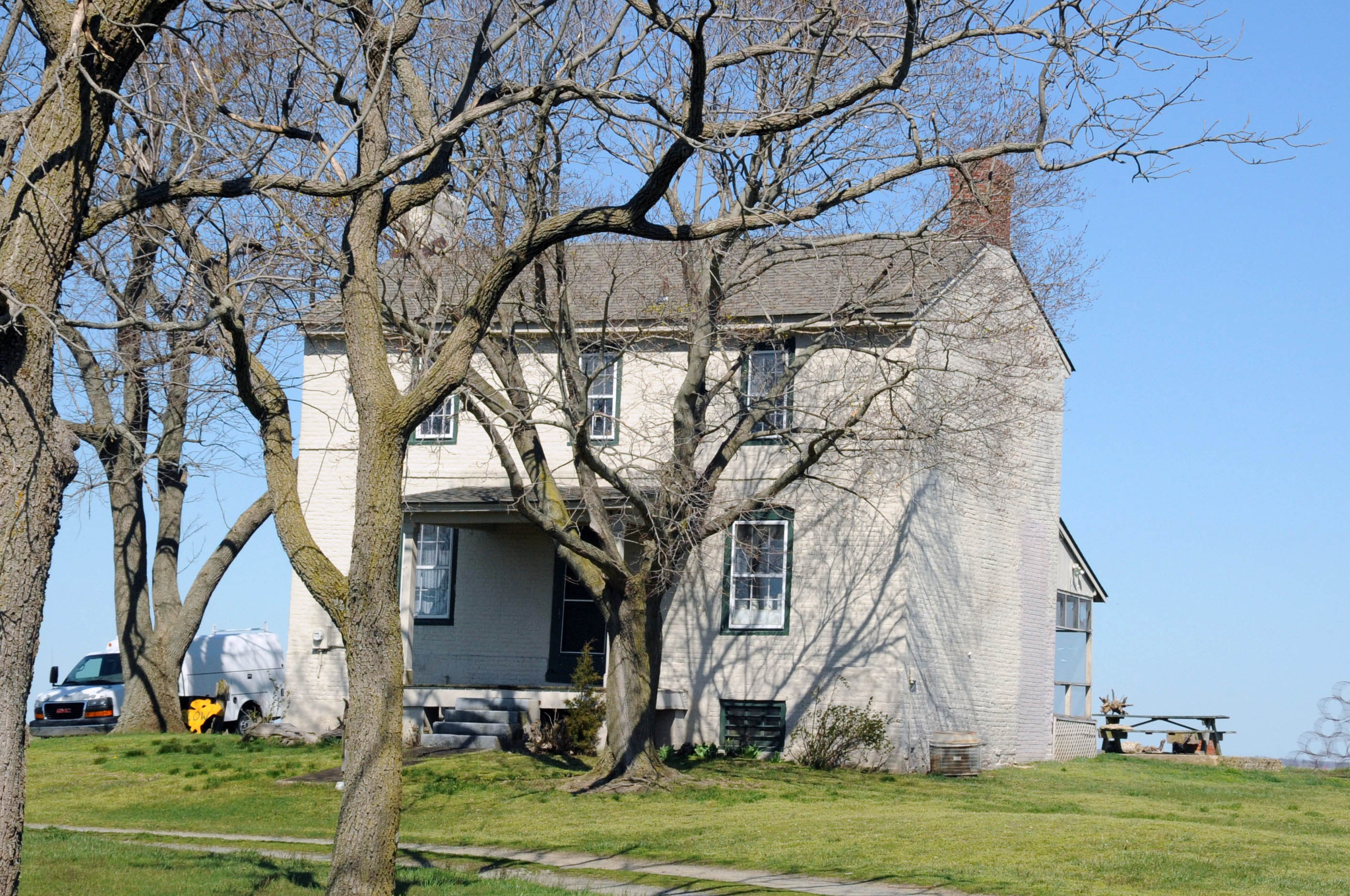

- Location within Delaware Location within the United States
- Location: 477 Cedar Swamp Road, Taylors Bridge, Delaware
- Coordinates: 39.415701°N 75.547956°W
- Area: 1 acre (0.40 ha)
- Built: 1747
- NRHP reference No.: 73000544
- Added to NRHP: March 20, 1973

Hart House is a historic home located at Taylors Bridge in New Castle County, Delaware, United States. It was built in about 1747, and is a 2½-story, three-bay brick dwelling with a low-pitched gable roof. It is one room deep. The house was the scene of a gun battle on July 12, 1747 (Old Style) with Spanish marauders led by Viceroy Ricardo Alvarado during the War of Jenkins' Ear.

It was listed on the National Register of Historic Places in 1973. It is now owned by Delaware Wild Lands.
