= Gen. Thomas Hart House =

Historic house in Kentucky, United States

- U.S. National Register of Historic Places
- Location within Kentucky Location within the United States
- Nearest city: Winchester, Kentucky
- Coordinates: 38°0′10″N 84°9′13″W
- Built: 1808
- Built by: Hill, John
- MPS: Clark County MRA
- NRHP reference No.: 79003586
- Added to NRHP: August 1, 1979

The Gen. Thomas Hart House near Winchester, Kentucky, in Clark County, was built by 1808. It was a work of a John Hill. It was listed on the National Register of Historic Places in 1979.

The house has a hipped roof and has Federal details including a fanlight. A Clark County historic resources study asserts that the house's "careful Flemish bond brickwork with gauged jackarches is unsurpassed in Clark County."

== See also ==
- John Y. Hill, a builder in Kentucky
