= Gideon Hart House =

Historic house in Ohio, United States

- U.S. National Register of Historic Places
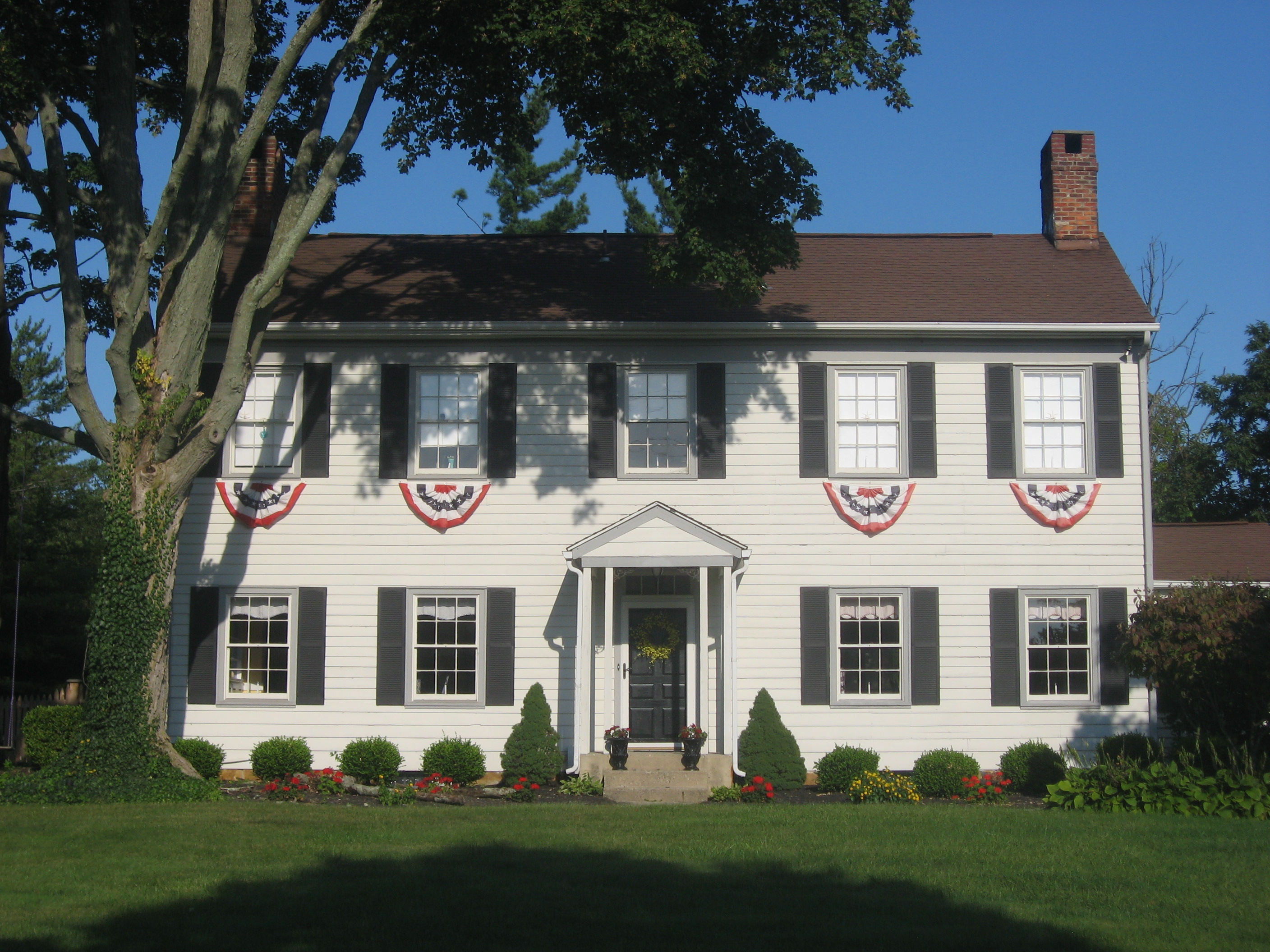
- Gideon Hart House in Westerville

- Location within Ohio Location within the United States
- Location: 636 Hempstead Rd. Westerville, Ohio
- Coordinates: 40°06′32″N 82°53′52″W
- Built: 1820
- NRHP reference No.: 73001442
- Added to NRHP: August 14, 1973

The Gideon Hart House is the oldest home in Westerville, Ohio, United States. Built in 1820, the home is listed on the National Register of Historic Places. Located at 636 S. Hempstead Road, it was originally built by Gideon Hart on land awarded to his father for service in the Revolutionary War.

Gideon Hart and family moved from Connecticut to Ohio in 1816 to take advantage of the land tract of 380 acres. The original tract went from the current land east as far as the current Hoover Reservoir. Hart was a prominent man who built multiple sawmills (due to fire destruction), orchards, farming and a sugar maple stand. He also served as a Justice of the Peace and was integral in the development of Blendon Township, much of which was subsequently incorporated into Westerville. It is now at the front of the subdivision Woodglen. Gideon Hart died in 1859 and he and other family members are buried in the Blendon Township Cemetery on the corner of Dempsey Road and Hempstead Road in Westerville.

The house has seen multiple updates over the years, but much of the original structure and details are still intact. There are still burn marks on the original wood floors, imported tile around each of the three fireplaces (installed 1928), and even bark on the main support beam of the home. Most notably, the home's kitchen, which was added in the 1940s, was completely demolished and rebuilt in 2002–2003. An upstairs bathroom and closet was added to the master bedroom at this time.
