= Rodney G. Hart House =

- U.S. National Register of Historic Places
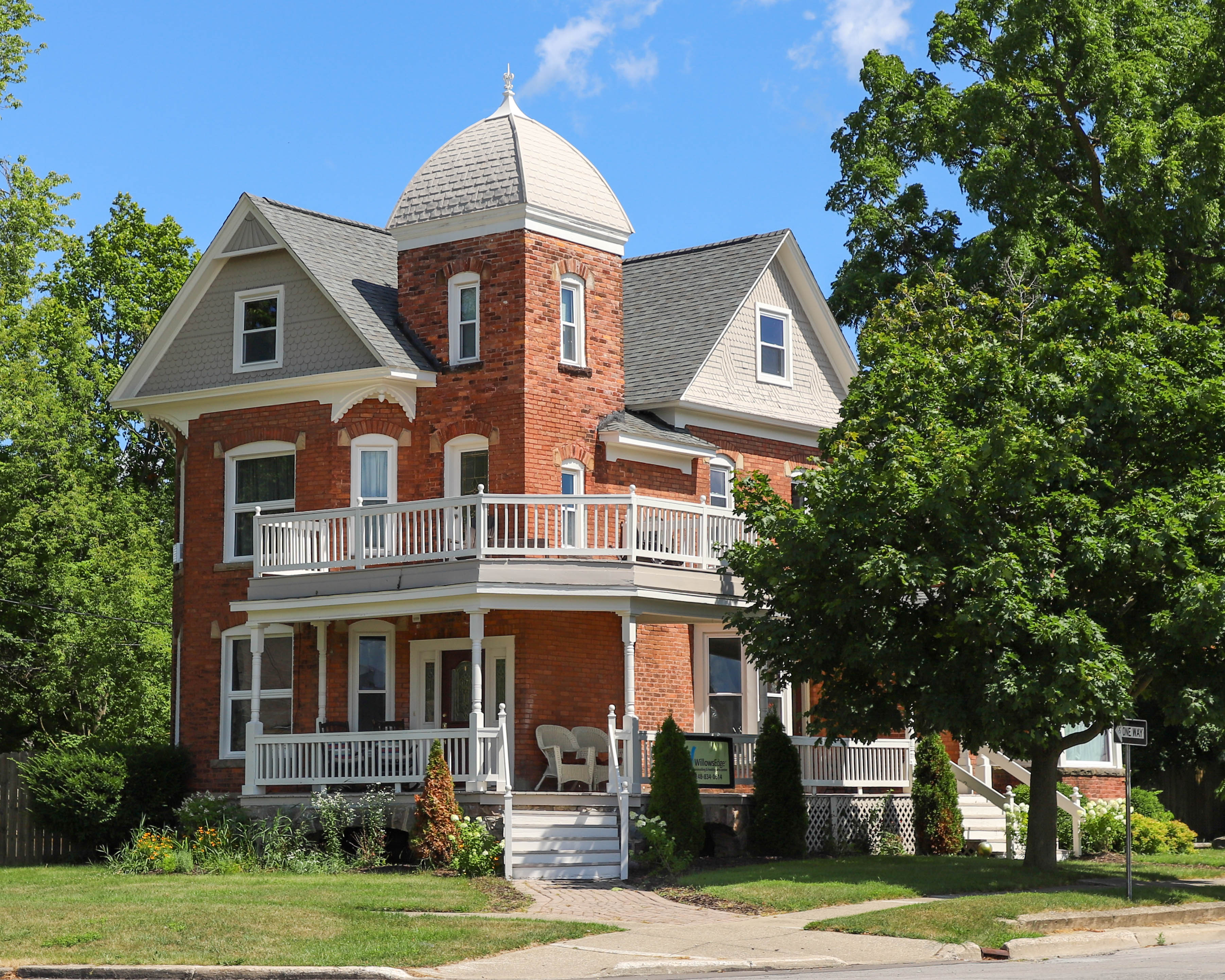

- Location within Michigan Location within the United States
- Interactive map
- Location: 244 W. Park St., Lapeer, Michigan
- Coordinates: 43°03′19″N 83°18′44″W
- Area: less than one acre
- Built: 1890
- Architectural style: Queen Anne
- MPS: Lapeer MRA
- NRHP reference No.: 85001627
- Added to NRHP: July 26, 1985

The Rodney G. Hart House is a single-family home located at 244 W. Park Street in Lapeer, Michigan. It was listed on the National Register of Historic Places in 1985. The Rodney G. Hart House reflects the period of strong economic development following the arrival of Lapeer's first railroad in 1871, and utilizes to the fullest the money, materials, and manpower that could so richly interpret the popular Queen Anne styles.

== History ==
In 1890, this house was built for Rodney G. Hart. Mr. Hart was born in 1831, and was the first child born in the city of Lapeer. His father, Alvin N. Hart, was one of the first settlers of Lapeer, and more importantly is responsible for the construction of the historic Lapeer County Courthouse. Rodney Hart pursued a number of business ventures in the Lapeer area. He was Lapeer's third mayor, constructed the first grain elevator in Lapeer, served as postmaster, and was involved in banking, farming and stockbreeding. Naturally, this adventurous man was responsible for bringing the first automobile to Lapeer from Chicago in the Spring of 1901.

== Description ==
The Rodney G. Hart House is an ample, elegant Queen Anne residence executed in brick, stone, and wood. This house is a two-story, brick, Queen Anne structure built on a stone foundation. Its front entryway is oriented in the corner, facing the intersection of Park and Cedar Streets. The entry porch at this corner is approached via a corner stair, and sits on an arched stone foundation and wraps around both adjacent facades. A three-story square brick tower is located above, and is capped by a domed hip roof. Gable roofs flank the tower with decoratively shingled gable ends. The windows are double-hung, one-over-one units, and the main facade has chamfered corners where the second-floor windows are accented with hoods and large brackets.
