= Lucy Hart House =

Historic residence in Worthington, Ohio

- U.S. National Register of Historic Places
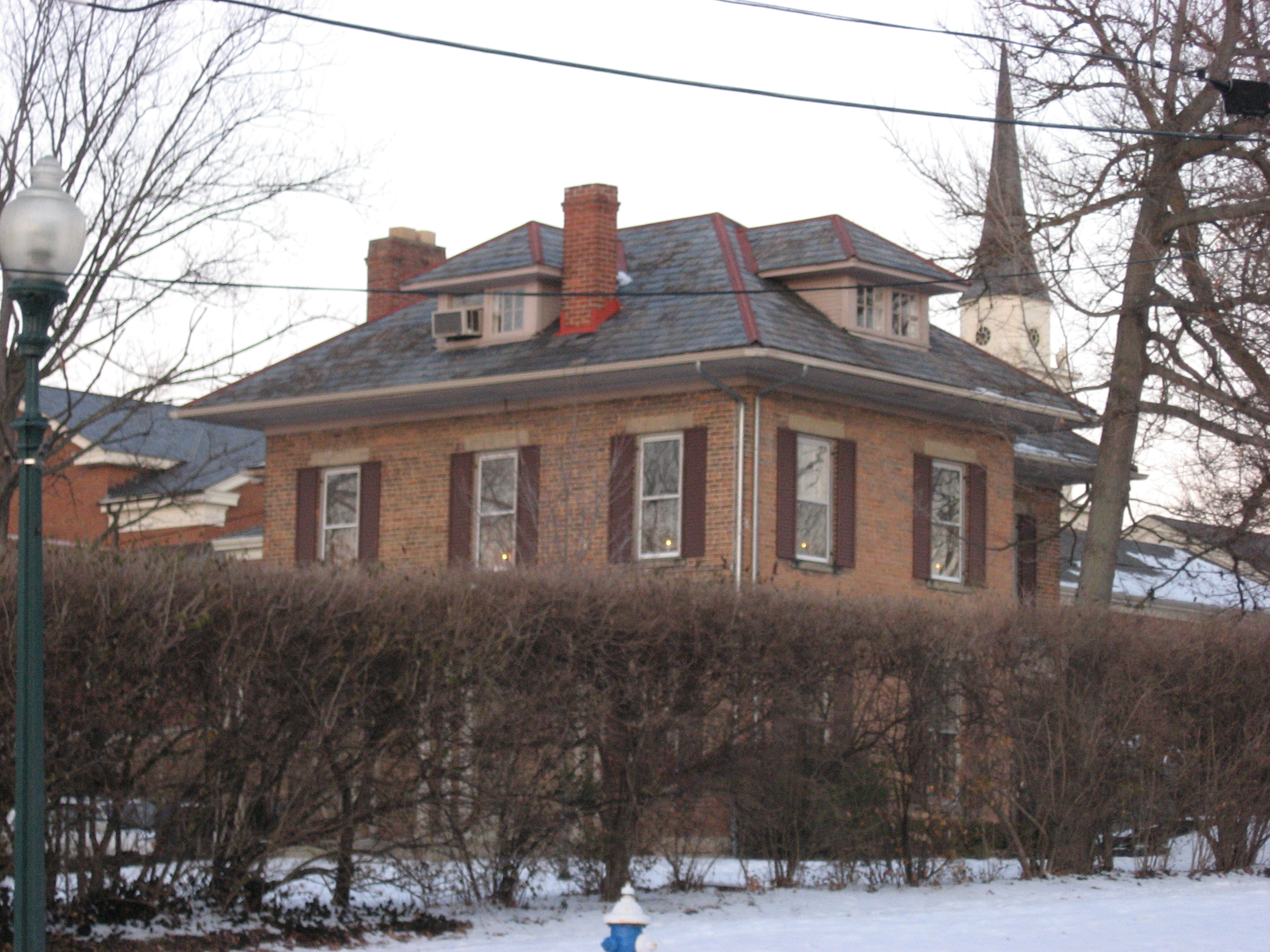
- Lucy Hart House in 2010

- Location within Ohio Location within the United States
- Location: 64 W. Granville Rd, Worthington, Ohio, U.S.
- Coordinates: 40.0891°N 83.0197°W
- Architectural style: Italianate
- NRHP reference No.: 80003008
- Added to NRHP: April 17, 1980

The Lucy Hart House, also known as the Cyrus Fay House, is a historic Italianate residence located in Worthington, Ohio. It was listed in the National Register of Historic Places on April 17, 1980.

The home was constructed after the Civil War and is named after Lucy Hart, whose husband helped construct a nearby railroad in Worthington. It was added to the National Register of Historic Places because of its incorporation of Italianate architecture, which was uncommon in Worthington at the time.
