= John Hart House (Portsmouth, New Hampshire) =

Historic house in New Hampshire, United States

- U.S. National Register of Historic Places
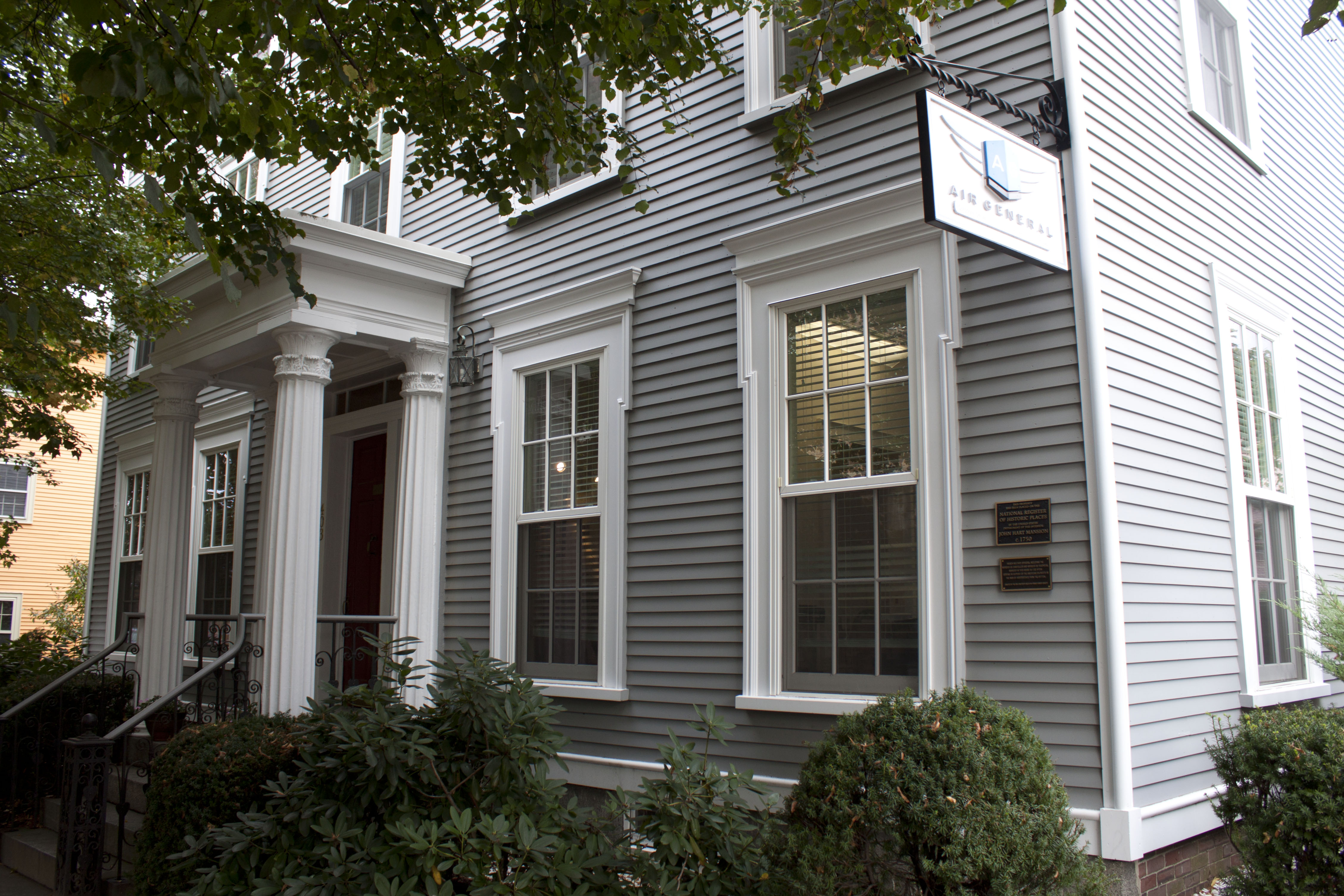

- Location within New Hampshire Location within the United States
- Location: 403 The Hill, Portsmouth, New Hampshire
- Coordinates: 43°4′43″N 70°45′37″W
- Area: less than one acre
- Built: 1835
- Architectural style: Greek Revival, Late Victorian, Federal
- NRHP reference No.: 72000082
- Added to NRHP: November 14, 1972

The John Hart House is a historic house at 403 The Hill in Portsmouth, New Hampshire. Built in the late 18th century, this comparatively modest house exhibits stylistic changes reflective of architectural trends up to the mid 19th century. It was moved to its present location in the 1970s as part of a road widening project. It was listed on the National Register of Historic Places in 1972.

== Description and history ==
The John Hart House stands in The Hill, a cluster of closely spaced historic houses bounded on the north by Deer Street and the east by High Street at the northern edge of downtown Portsmouth. This grouping was created by a road widening project from houses originally located on or near Deer Street. This house is located on the west side of the cluster, just south of the Daniel Pinkham House and west of the Phoebe Hart House. It is a three-story wood-frame structure, with a hip roof, two interior chimneys, and a clapboarded exterior, and is oriented facing west. The main facade is five bays wide, with a center entrance sheltered by a Greek Revival portico with Corinthian columns. Its windows are framed by Federal-period eared moulding. The interior includes a Georgian-style central stair, with an arched Georgian window above the landing. Some of the fireplace surrounds reflect Federal and Greek Revival restylings.

When first built in the mid-18th century, this house was a two-story wood-frame structure. Early in the 18th century a third floor was added, and it was given extensive Federal-style treatment. These alterations included the replacement of original Georgian windows with long windows with eared surrounds. In the 1830s, the Greek Revival portico was added, and Victorian fireplaces were also added. Additions were originally in place on the rear of the house, and in the 20th century it had been adapted for use as a nursing home. It was moved to its present location as part of a redevelopment project, and presently houses commercial offices.

== See also ==
- National Register of Historic Places listings in Rockingham County, New Hampshire
