= Hart Building (Marysville, California) =

- U.S. National Register of Historic Places
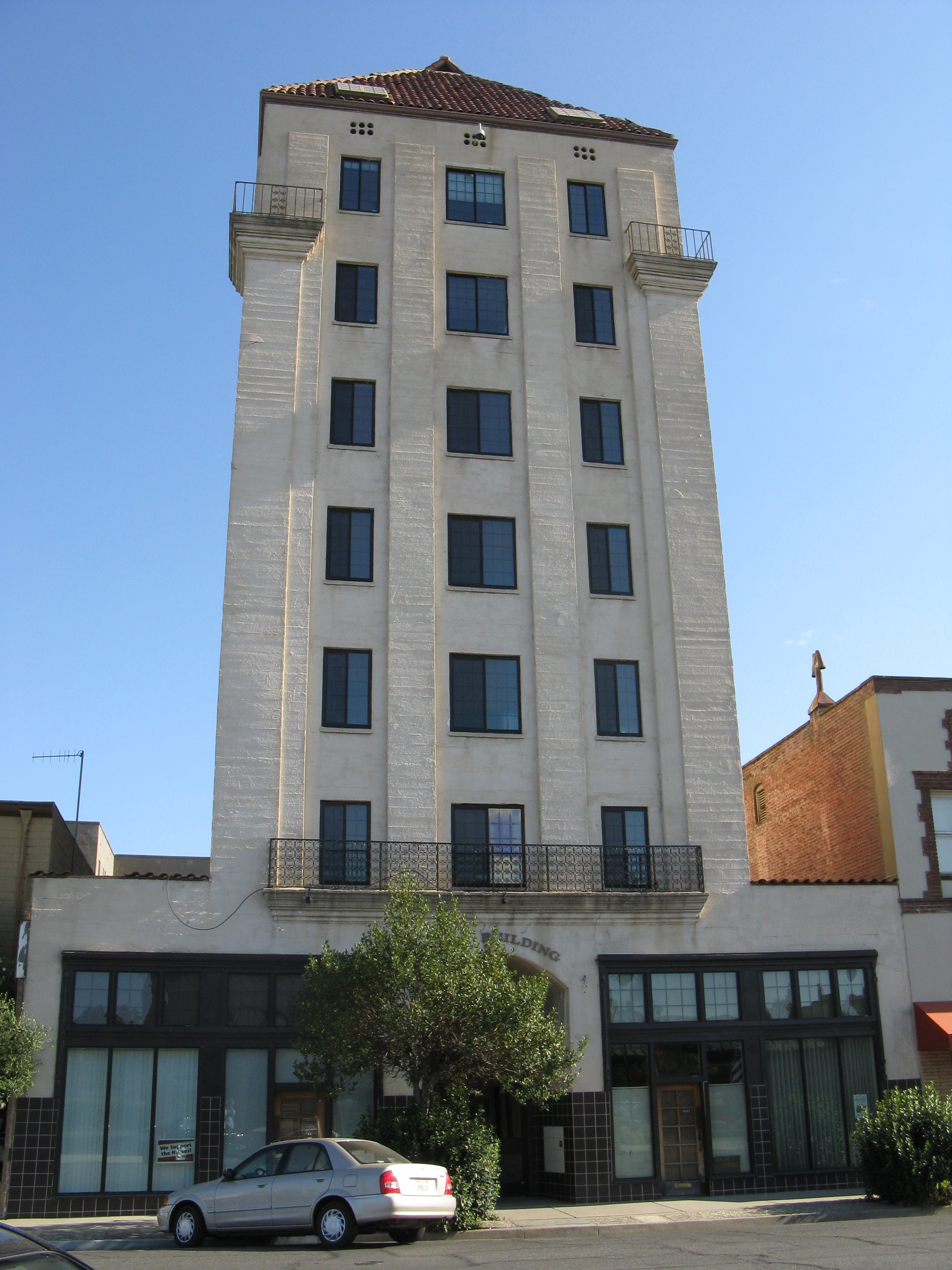

- Location within California
- Location: 423-425 4th St., Marysville, California
- Coordinates: 39°08′22″N 121°35′19″W
- Area: 0.1 acres (0.040 ha)
- Built: 1927
- Built by: George Hudnutt
- Architect: Dean & Dean
- NRHP reference No.: 82002285
- Added to NRHP: January 28, 1982

The Hart Building, at 423-425 4th St. in Marysville, California, was built in 1927. It was listed on the National Register of Historic Places in 1982. It has also been known as the Brown Building and as the Nagler Building.

It is Marysville's only skyscraper.

It was built for the Hart Brothers, of Sacramento, California. It was designed by architects Dean & Dean and built by Sacramento general contractor George Hudnutt.
