= Bullard-Hart House =

Historic house in Georgia, United States

- U.S. National Register of Historic Places
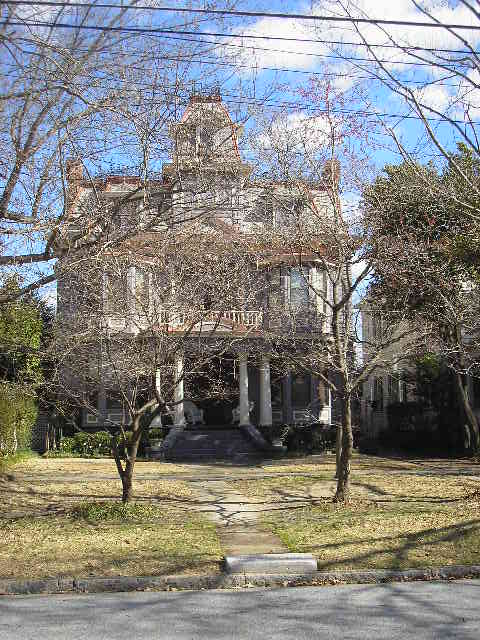

- Location within Georgia Location within the United States
- Location: 1408 3rd Ave., Columbus, Georgia
- Coordinates: 32°28′23″N 84°59′20″W
- Area: less than one acre
- Built: 1887-90
- Architect: L.E. Thornton
- Architectural style: Second Empire
- NRHP reference No.: 77000439
- Added to NRHP: July 28, 1977

The Bullard-Hart House in Columbus, Georgia was built during 1887-90 for Dr. William L. Bullard, Columbus physician and pioneer ear, eye, nose, and throat specialist.

The house is a splendid example of Second Empire Victorian architecture. It was designed by architect L. E. Thornton of New York.

The Bullard family lived here for 90 years. Their guests included President Franklin D. Roosevelt and Generals George Patton and George Marshall who dined on "Country Captain," a popular regional dish originated by the family cook, Arie Mullins.

The house was listed on the U.S. National Register of Historic Places in 1977.

It was painstakingly restored in 1978 by new owners, Dr. and Mrs. Lloyd Sampson.
