= Lovira Hart, Jr., and Esther Maria Parker Farm =

- Hart, Jr., Lovira and Esther Maria Parker, Farm
- U.S. National Register of Historic Places
- U.S. Historic district
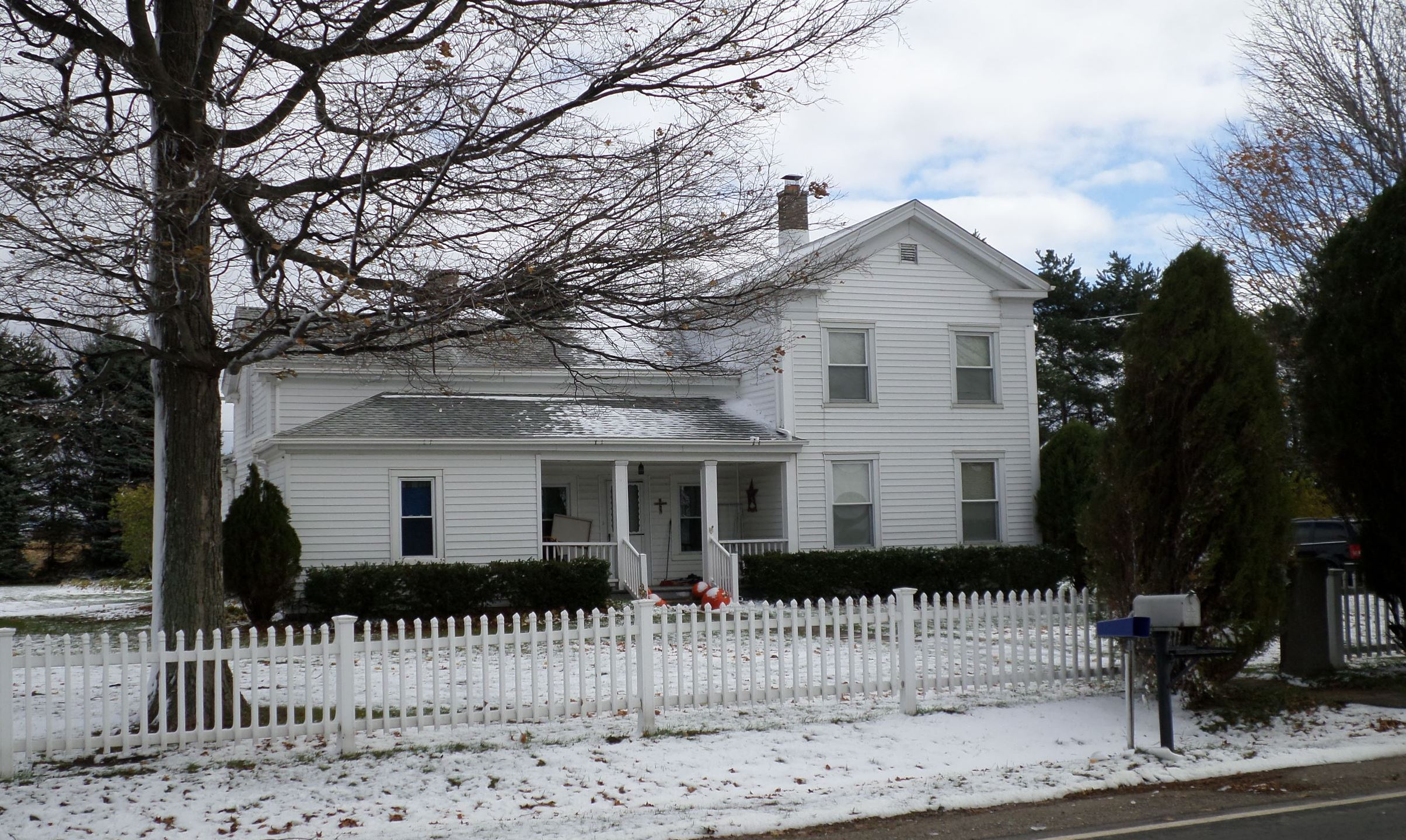

- Location within Michigan Location within the United States
- Interactive map
- Location: 9491 W. Frankenmuth Rd., Tuscola Township, Michigan
- Coordinates: 43°20′7″N 83°40′34″W
- Area: 63 acres (25 ha)
- Built: 1848
- Architectural style: Greek Revival
- NRHP reference No.: 04000599
- Added to NRHP: June 16, 2004

The Lovira Hart, Jr., and Esther Maria Parker Farm is a historic farmstead located at 9491 West Frankenmuth Road in Tuscola Township, Michigan. It was settled in 1836 and has been continuously owned by the same family since that time. It was listed on the National Register of Historic Places in 2004.

== History ==
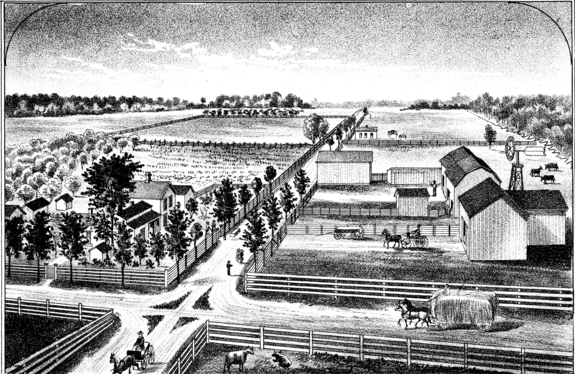
Lovira Hart Farm c. 1883

Lovira Hart grew up in Mount Morris, New York. In late 1836, Lovira and his wife's brother, John Abbey, traveled to Tuscola County and purchased land. They were some of the first European settlers in the area. In 1837 Hart constructed a log cabin and returned to New York to bring his family. In mid-1837 Lovira, his wife Hannah Emeline, and their family moved to this location in Michigan. However, in 1841 Hannah Emeline died in childbirth, leaving Lovira with four young children. Lovira Hart remarried in 1842, to Esther Maria Parker; the couple had three more children.

Lovira Hart became involved in local government and politics, serving as Tuscola Township Supervisor in 1844, 1846, 1851, and 1857, as Township Treasurer in 1850, and he was elected Tuscola County's first County Judge in 1850. He also built one of the township's first schools in 1850.

Hart constructed the farmhouse on the property between 1848 and 1852, when the family moved in. A well house and barn were built some time later. The farmstead was substantially upgraded in 1880, with an addition to the house and the construction of several outbuildings. Lovira Hart died in 1892, passing the farm down to his descendants. Additional buildings on the property were constructed through the first half of the 20th century.

== Description ==
The Lovira Hart, Jr., and Esther Maria Parker Farm complex straddles Hart Road, and includes a c. 1850 farmhouse with multiple outbuildings. The house is of post and beam construction on a stone foundation. It is a front gable Greek Revival Upright and Wing structure with a two-story upright and single story wing. A single-story addition is located at the rear. There is a small covered front porch on the wing section, supported by two square columns, sheltering the entry door which is symmetrically flanked by two windows. The house is clad with clapboard, now covered with vinyl siding. Greek Revival detailing includes the low-pitched roofs, cornice returns, symmetrical placement of the windows, and the wide band of divided trim along the cornice line of the upright.

Outbuildings in the complex near the house include: an 1852 gable-roof wellhouse, a 1920 concrete block ash house, a 1920 garage, a 1942 hog cot, and a 1910 hog barn with a gambrel roof. Across the road there are more buildings, including a pre-1880 horse and buggy barn, a windmill and watering trough shed, a large 1870 gambrel roof barn, two milk houses, a silo, corn crib, chicken coop, and tool barn.
