= Trap Pond State Park =

State park in Delaware, United States

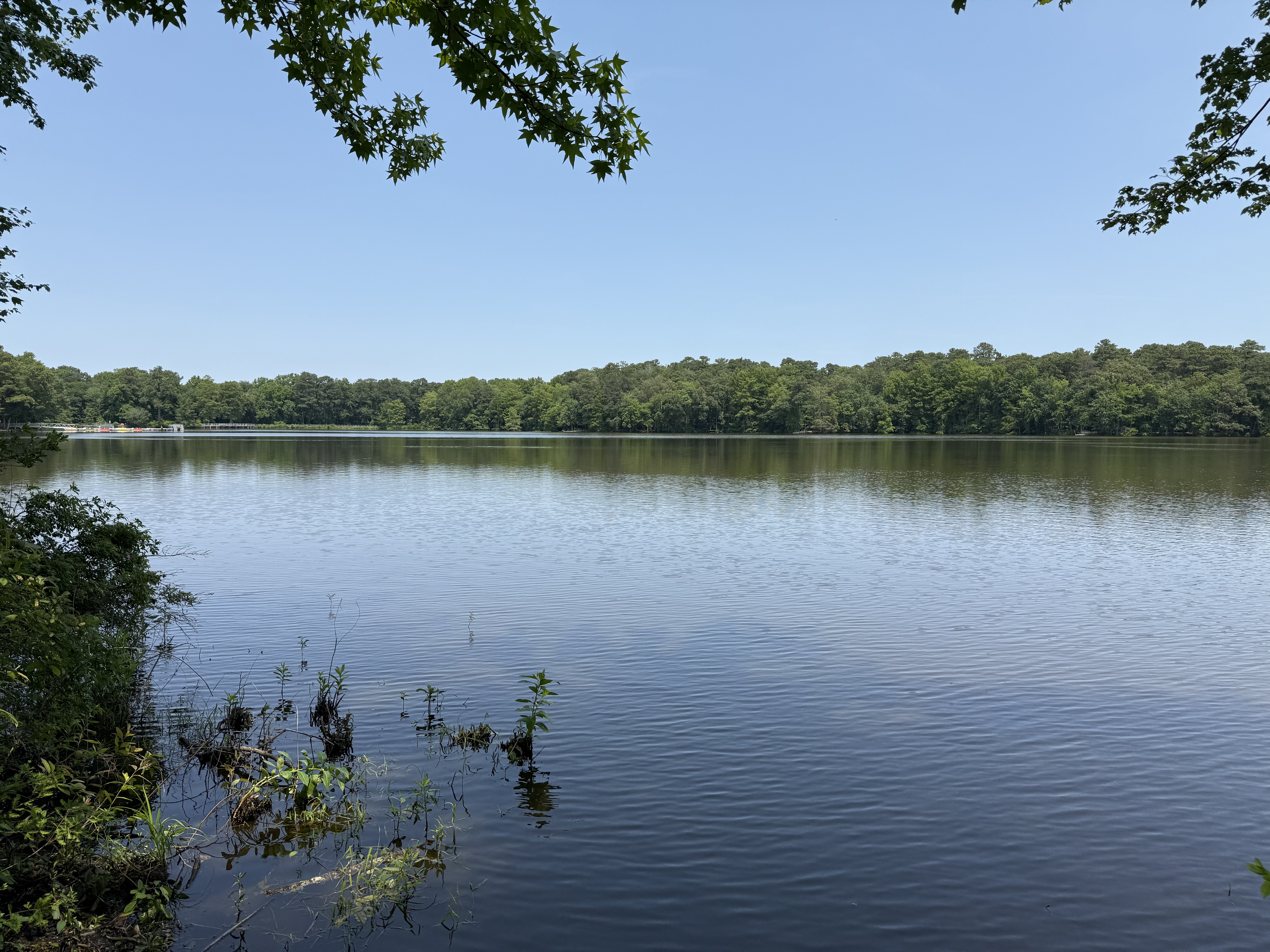
- Trap Pond in Trap Pond State Park

- Location within Delaware Location within the United States
- Location: Sussex County, Delaware, United States
- Nearest town: Laurel, Delaware
- Coordinates: 38°31′29″N 75°28′28″W
- Area: 3,993.28 acres (1,616.02 ha)
- Elevation: 33 ft (10 m)
- Established: 1951
- Administrator: Delaware Department of Natural Resources and Environmental Control
- Website: Official website

Trap Pond State Park is a 3,993.28 acres (1,616.02 ha) Delaware state park located near Laurel, Delaware, United States. It preserves one of the largest surviving fragments of what was once an extensive wetland in what is now southwestern Sussex County. The state park features an extensive patch of bald cypress trees.

== Bald cypress ecosystem ==
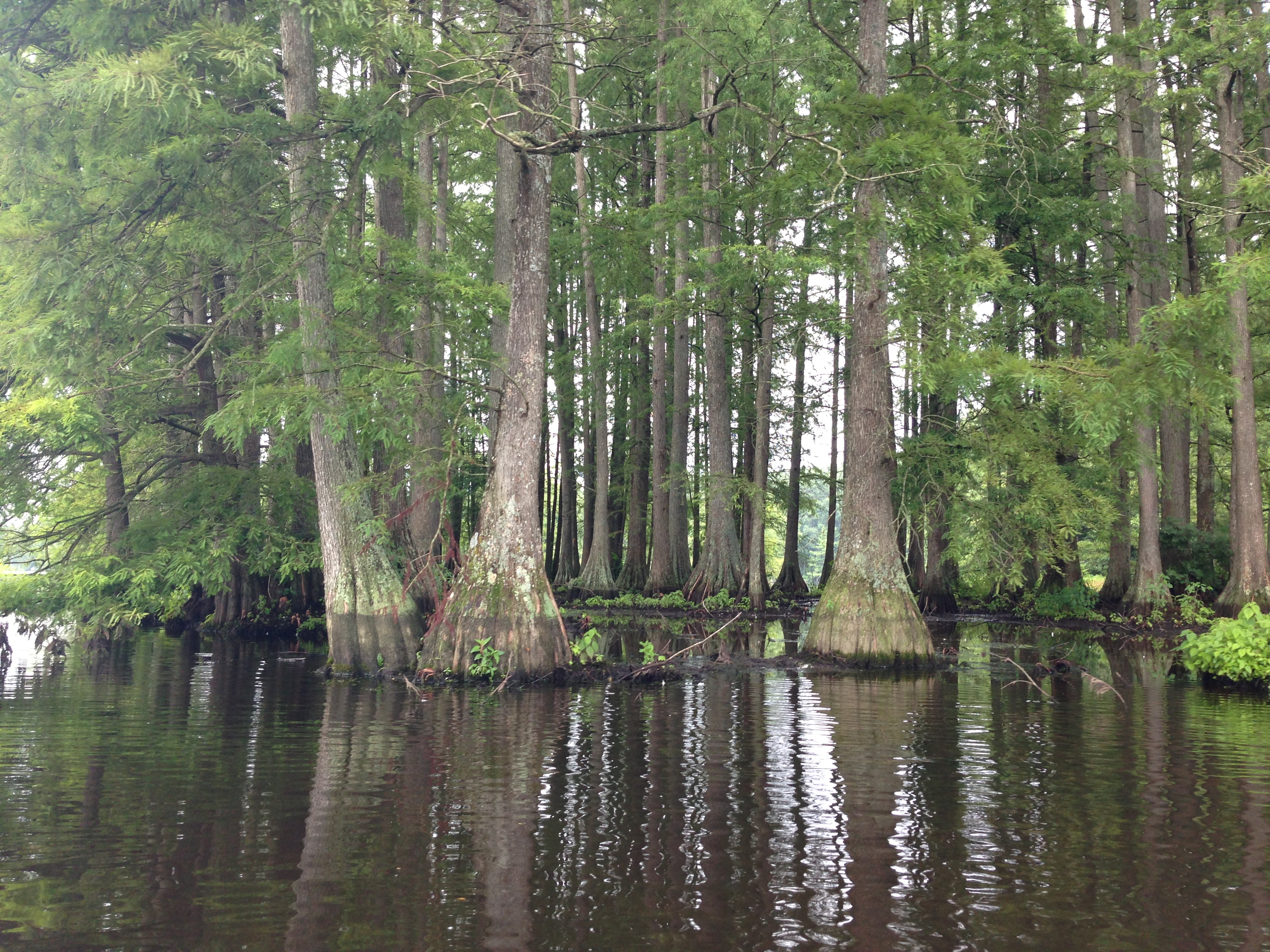
Cluster of bald cypress trees in Trap Pond State Park

The bald cypress is a wetland tree adapted to areas of calm, shallow standing water. Trap Pond State Park is the northernmost park in North America that includes cypress and bald cypress, although the actual range continues further north, ending just north of Georgetown, Delaware, in the Ellendale State Forest.

Many birds flock to stands of bald cypress, including great blue herons, owls, warblers, and pileated woodpeckers. Birdwatchers can also see hummingbirds and bald eagles at Trap Pond in season.

Large specimens of American holly, the state tree of Delaware, can also be seen in the Trap Pond bottomland.

== History ==
The rot-resistant wood of Trap Pond's bald cypress trees was extensively harvested starting in the 18th century. The lumbermen extensively altered the morphology of the wetland, damming its outflow to create power for a small sawmill to cut the timbers. This dam helped to create what is now Trap Pond, named after the Trap Mills, which were known by that name as early as the 1860s. The pond was enlarged in later years as nearby farmers laid down drainage tiles to de-water their wetlands for agriculture. After the old-growth cypress timber had been harvested, the pond and adjacent surviving wetlands were re-used as the drainage sump for the surrounding farmers of Sussex County.

In the 1930s, the federal Civilian Conservation Corps listed the pond as a place of recreation development. The Delaware legislature took over the land and named it as a state park on June 22, 1951, becoming the first state park in Delaware.

== Recreation ==
=== Boating ===
The partly sheltered waters of Trap Pond (90 acres/0.4 km²) are now managed as a waterway for family recreation. A concessioner rents canoes, kayaks, rowboats, and pedal boats. There is also a launching ramp for privately owned shallow-draft vessels.

Fishing opportunities concentrate on panfish such as crappie and bluegill, with some bass and pickerel as well.

=== Bald Cypress Nature Center ===
The Bald Cypress Nature Center features a display of some of the reptiles, fish and amphibians found in Trap Pond, as well as other natural history exhibits and a nature library. Programs include hayrides, guided nature walks and hikes, naturalist-led pontoon boat tours and outdoor skills workshops.

=== Camping ===
Trap Pond State Park's campground offers RV and tent sites, cabins and yurts.

=== Swimming ===
A sandy swimming beach was among the amenities already in place when the Delaware State Parks Commission took over Trap Pond in 1951, but is no longer available after being permanently closed on May 17, 2000.
