= Hart-Rice House =

Historic house in New Hampshire, United States

- U.S. National Register of Historic Places
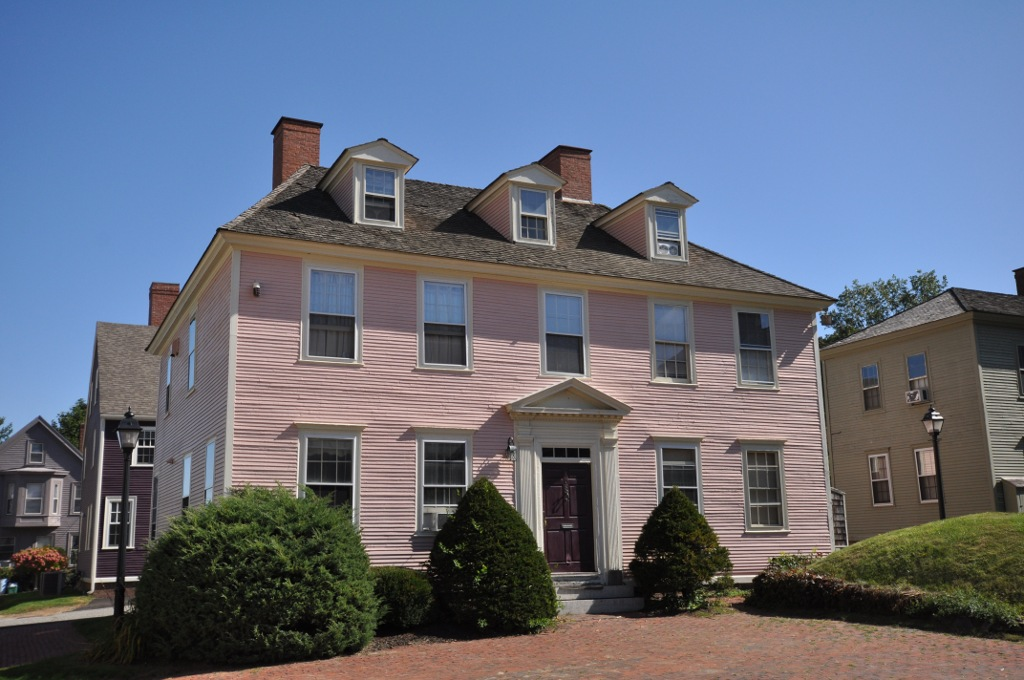

- Location within New Hampshire Location within the United States
- Location: 408 The Hill, Portsmouth, New Hampshire
- Coordinates: 43°4′43″N 70°45′36″W
- Area: less than one acre
- Built: 1752
- Architectural style: Georgian
- NRHP reference No.: 72000083
- Added to NRHP: August 7, 1972

The Hart-Rice House is a historic house at 408 The Hill in Portsmouth, New Hampshire. It is located on The Hill, a cluster of closely spaced historic buildings southeast of Deer Street, some of which were moved to the site as part of a road widening project. Built sometime between 1749 and 1756, it is a little-altered example of Georgian architecture with only modest Federal period alterations. It was listed on the National Register of Historic Places in 1972.

== Description and history ==
The Hart-Rice House stands in The Hill, a cluster of closely spaced historic houses bounded on the north by Deer Street and the east by High Street at the northern edge of downtown Portsmouth. This grouping was created by a road widening project from houses originally located on or near Deer Street. It is set in the central cluster, south of the Jeremiah Hart House and west of the Simeon P. Smith House. It is a 2 1/2-story wood-frame structure, with a hip roof and clapboarded exterior. It has two chimneys, and three original gable dormers piercing the roof on the main facade. The main entry is flanked by pilasters and topped by a triangular pediment. The interior retains many original Georgian period features, including paneling around all of its fireplaces.

The house was built facing Deer Street sometime between 1749, when Samuel Hart mortgaged the land, and 1756, when it was inventoried for his estate. In the early 19th century it was owner by William Hart, a ship's captain, who made modest alterations to the interior trim. Rice was locally prominent as a privateer during the War of 1812.

== See also ==
- National Register of Historic Places listings in Rockingham County, New Hampshire
