= John L. Hart House (Springville, South Carolina) =

Historic house in South Carolina, United States

- U.S. National Register of Historic Places
- Location within South Carolina Location within the United States
- Location: E of CR 133, Springville, South Carolina
- Coordinates: 34°20′42″N 79°51′7″W
- Area: 1.6 acres (0.65 ha)
- Built: 1856
- MPS: Springville MRA
- NRHP reference No.: 85003138
- Added to NRHP: October 10, 1985

John L. Hart House, also known as Goodson House, is a historic home located at Springville, Darlington County, South Carolina. It was built about 1856 and is a two-story rectangular frame house with a central block and telescoping wings. It is clad in weatherboard and features a hip-roofed, one-story porch across the front façade. At the outbreak of the American Civil War, Hart was commissioned an officer in the Confederate Army and was killed in action.

It was listed on the National Register of Historic Places in 1985.
