= Whidden-Ward House =

Historic house in New Hampshire, United States

- U.S. National Register of Historic Places
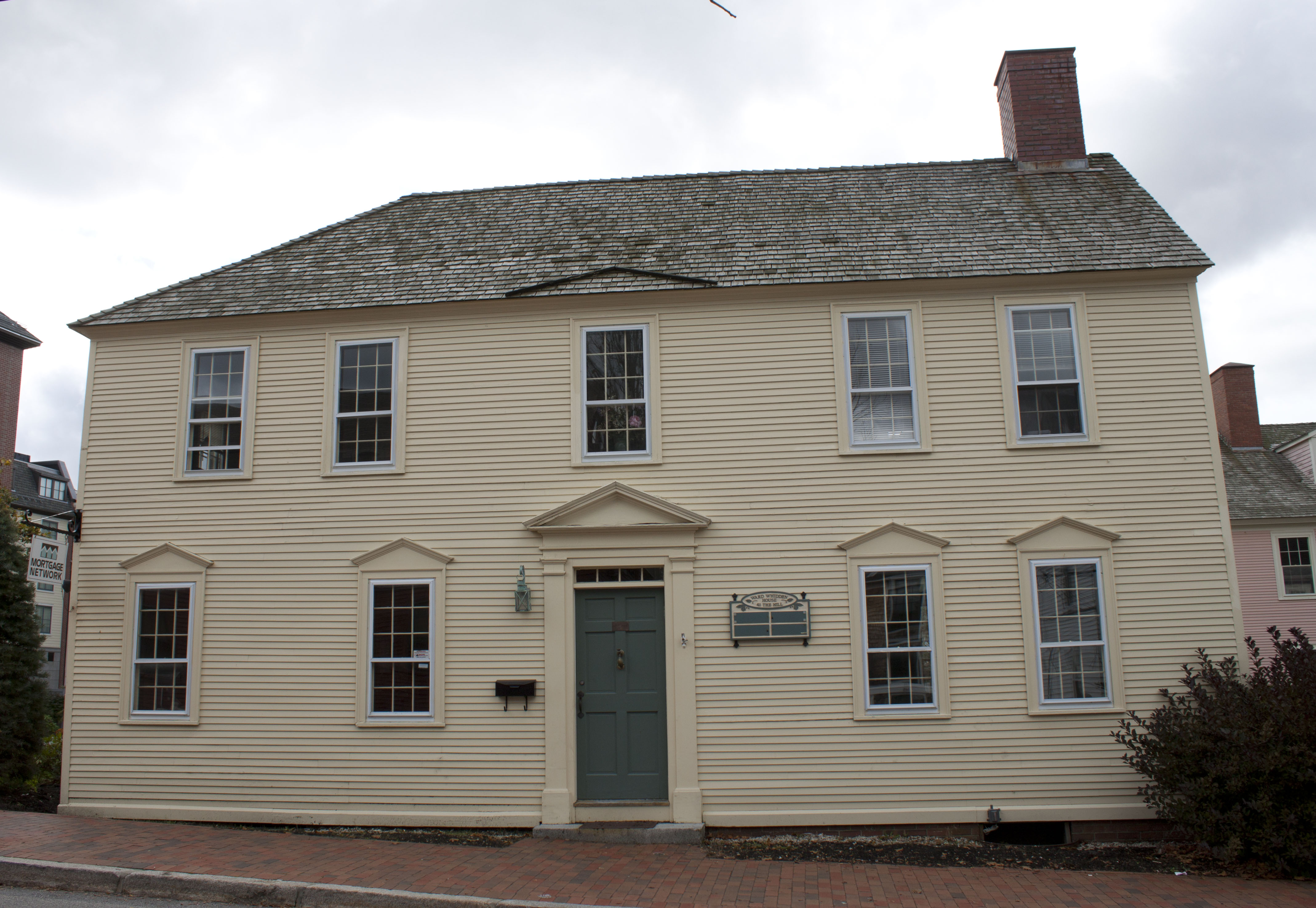

- Location within New Hampshire Location within the United States
- Location: The Hill, Portsmouth, New Hampshire
- Coordinates: 43°4′43″N 70°45′41″W
- Area: 0 acres (0 ha)
- Built: c. 1720
- Architectural style: Georgian
- NRHP reference No.: 71000077
- Added to NRHP: November 5, 1971

The Whidden-Ward House is a historic house at 411 High Street in Portsmouth, New Hampshire. Probably built in the late 1720s, it is a well-preserved example of Georgian architecture. The house was added to the National Register of Historic Places in 1972.

== Description and history ==
The Whidden Ward House is located on the southwest side of High Street, southeast of its junction with Deer Street. It is located in an area known as The Hill, a cluster of historic properties south of Deer Street which was created as part of a road widening project. It is a 2 1/2-story L-shaped wood-frame structure, with a gabled and hipped roof and clapboarded exterior. A single brick chimney is located at one end. Its main facade is five bays wide, with a center entrance flanked by pilasters and topped by a four-light transom and a pedimented gable. The first-floor windows are topped by gables. The interior has a particularly fine carved Georgian staircase, with an arched window at the landing.

The house is thought to have been built in the early 1720s by Michael Whidden, a joiner, and was originally located on Deer Street, an area that was platted for development in 1712. After his death in 1773 the house was purchased by Nathum Ward, who extensively renovated the property, giving it most of its surviving late-Georgian appearance. The only major addition to the house was a 19th-century leanto extension to the rear. The building was moved to its present location in the 1970s, and is now in commercial use.

== See also ==
- National Register of Historic Places listings in Rockingham County, New Hampshire
