= John D. Hart House =

- U.S. National Register of Historic Places
- New Jersey Register of Historic Places
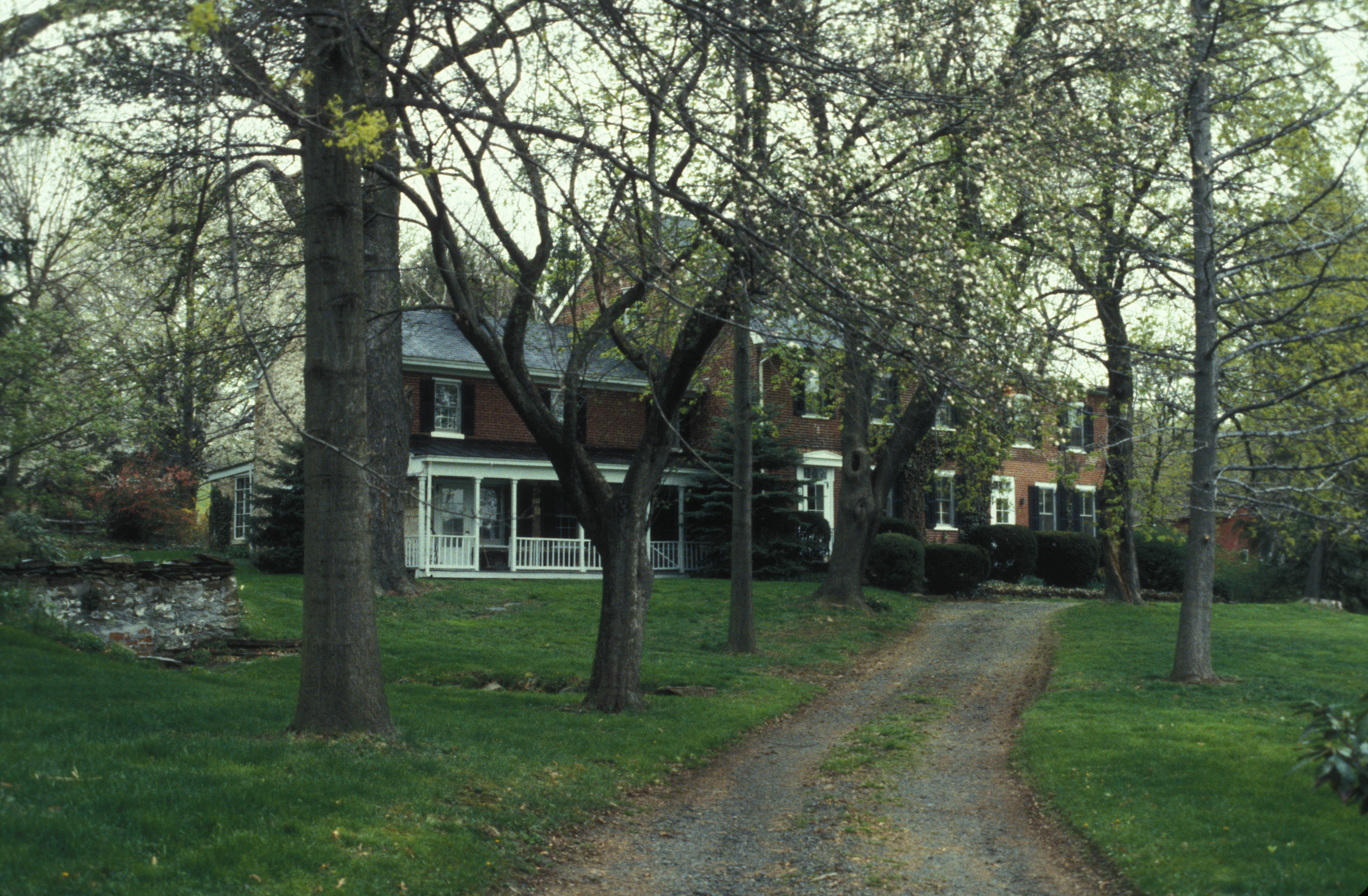

- Location within Mercer County, New Jersey Location within New Jersey Location within the United States
- Location: 54 East Curlis Avenue, Pennington, New Jersey
- Coordinates: 40°19′18″N 74°46′59″W
- Built: c. 1800
- NRHP reference No.: 72000800
- NJRHP No.: 1685

Significant dates
- Added to NRHP: October 18, 1972
- Designated NJRHP: March 17, 1972

The John D. Hart House is a historic home built c. 1800 and located at 54 East Curlis Avenue in Hopewell Township near the borough of Pennington in Mercer County, New Jersey. It was documented by the Historic American Buildings Survey in 1937. The house was added to the National Register of Historic Places on October 18, 1972, for its significance in architecture.

== History and description ==
Built c. 1800, the house is an example of a clapboard house in the county. Its builder is presumed to be a relation, perhaps a nephew, of John Hart, who was a signer of the Declaration of Independence and lived in nearby Hopewell. The house is notable for its similarity to the John White House in Lawrenceville.

== See also ==
- National Register of Historic Places listings in Mercer County, New Jersey
