= Henry Sherburne House =

Historic house in New Hampshire, United States

- U.S. National Register of Historic Places
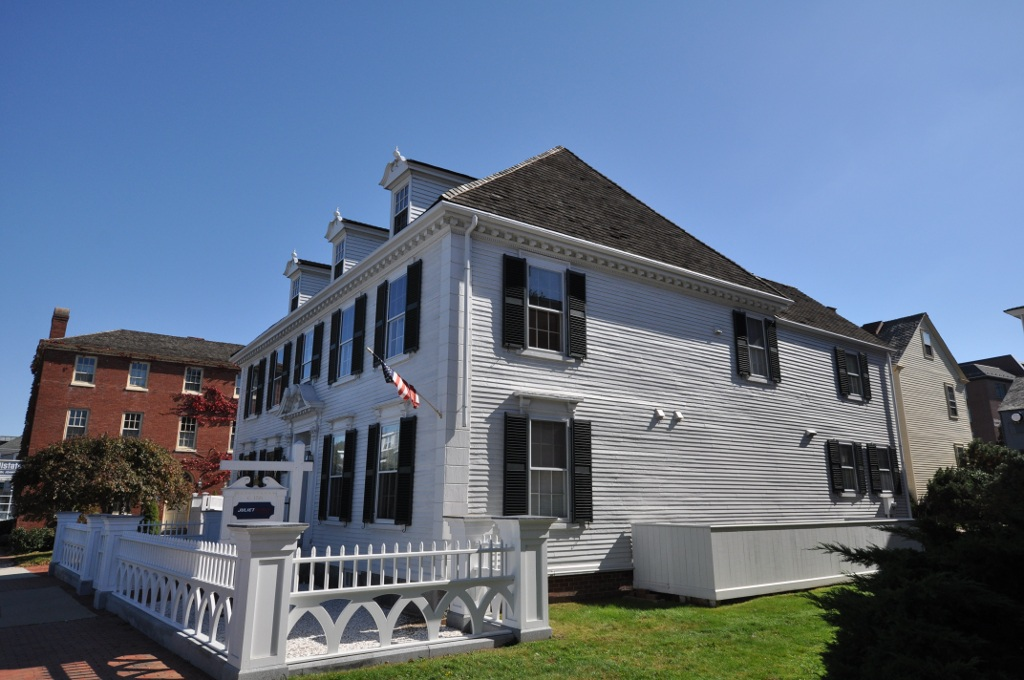

- Location within New Hampshire Location within the United States
- Location: The Hill, Portsmouth, New Hampshire
- Coordinates: 43°4′44″N 70°45′41″W
- Area: less than one acre
- Built: 1766
- Architectural style: Georgian
- NRHP reference No.: 72000087
- Added to NRHP: August 7, 1972

The Henry Sherburne House is a historic house at 62 Deer Street in Portsmouth, New Hampshire. Built about 1766, it is a well-preserved example of late Georgian architecture in the city, distinctive for its scrolled pediment entrance surrounded, the only in situ period example of its style. The house was listed on the National Register of Historic Places in 1972.

== Description and history ==
The Henry Sherburne House stands on the west side of The Hill, a cluster of historic houses southwest of the junction of Deer and High Streets. Many of these houses, the Sherburne House among them, were relocated to this area as part of a road widening project. It is a two-story wood-frame structure, with a hip roof, clapboarded exterior, set facing west toward Deer Street near its junction with Russell Street. Its front-facing roof is pierced by three gabled dormers, whose scrolled pediments echo that found above the main entrance. The front facade is five bays wide, with the main entrance at its center, flanked by pilasters and topped by an entablature and elaborate broken scrolled pediment. The roof line is adorned with a heavy modillioned cornice.

This house was built sometime between 1766 and 1770, and originally faced east toward Deer Street prior to being moved to this location. It is an unusually large house for this part of Portsmouth in the late Georgian period. Its front doorway is also distinctive, as the only known in situ scrolled pediment doorway to survive from the period in the entire state. It is believed that this pediment was used as a model by preservationist Wallace Nutting when he undertook the restoration of the Wentworth-Gardner House.

== See also ==
- National Register of Historic Places listings in Rockingham County, New Hampshire
