= Daniel Pinkham House =

Historic house in New Hampshire, United States

- U.S. National Register of Historic Places
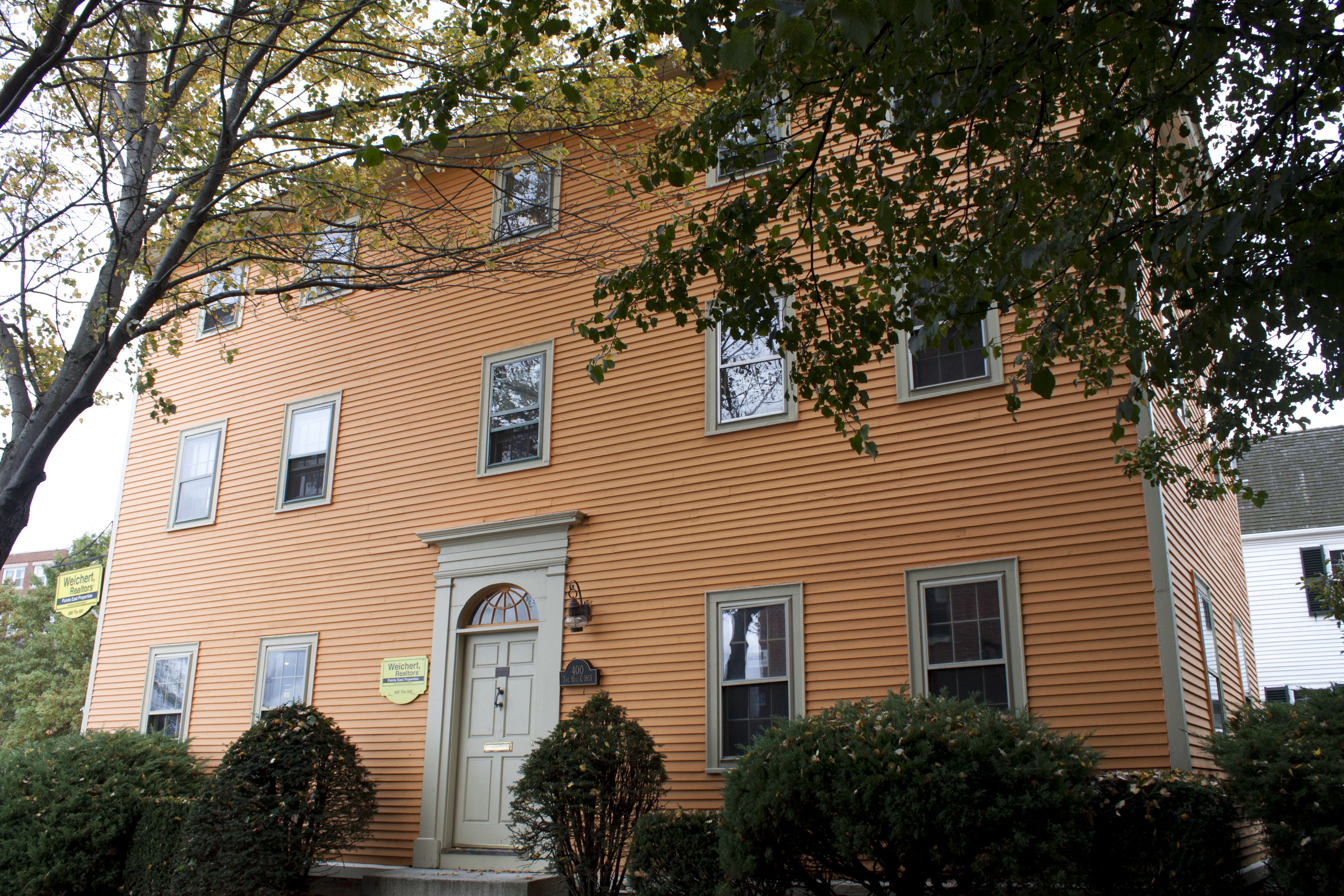

- Location within New Hampshire Location within the United States
- Location: 400 The Hill, Portsmouth, New Hampshire
- Coordinates: 43°4′43″N 70°45′38″W
- Area: less than one acre
- Built: 1813
- Architectural style: Federal
- NRHP reference No.: 72000086
- Added to NRHP: November 3, 1972

The Daniel Pinkham House is a historic house at 400 The Hill in Portsmouth, New Hampshire. Built c. 1813–15, it is one of the finest Federal period houses surviving on the city's north side. It was listed on the National Register of Historic Places in 1972.

== Description and history ==
The Daniel Pinkham House is one of a cluster of houses known as The Hill, located south of Deer Street north of downtown Portsmouth, that was created as the result of a road works project in the 1970s. It is a three-story wood-frame structure, with a low-pitch hip roof and clapboarded exterior. Its main facade is five bays wide with a center entrance; the windows are simply trimmed, with smaller windows on the third floor. Its front entry is flanked by Adamesque pilasters with rope molding, and topped by a semicircular fanlight window. The interior features original cornices, doors, and other woodwork.

The house was built c. 1813–15 by Daniel and Isaac Pinkham, in the wake of Portland's devastating 1813 fire. The latter was a noted local cabinetmaker, whose work is presumed to decorate the interior. Although its exterior was altered in the late 19th century by the addition of Victorian elements, these were removed when the house was renovated and moved in the 1970s.

== See also ==
- National Register of Historic Places listings in Rockingham County, New Hampshire
