= John L. Hart House (Hartsville, South Carolina) =

Historic house in South Carolina, United States

- U.S. National Register of Historic Places
- U.S. Historic district – Contributing property
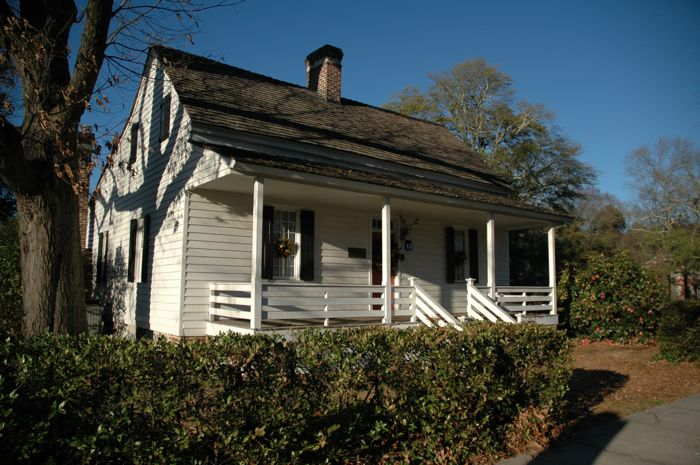

- Location within South Carolina Location within the United States
- Location: 106 E Home Ave., Hartsville, South Carolina
- Coordinates: 34°22′36″N 80°4′26″W
- Area: 0.2 acres (0.081 ha)
- Built: 1850
- NRHP reference No.: 83003843
- Added to NRHP: November 10, 1983

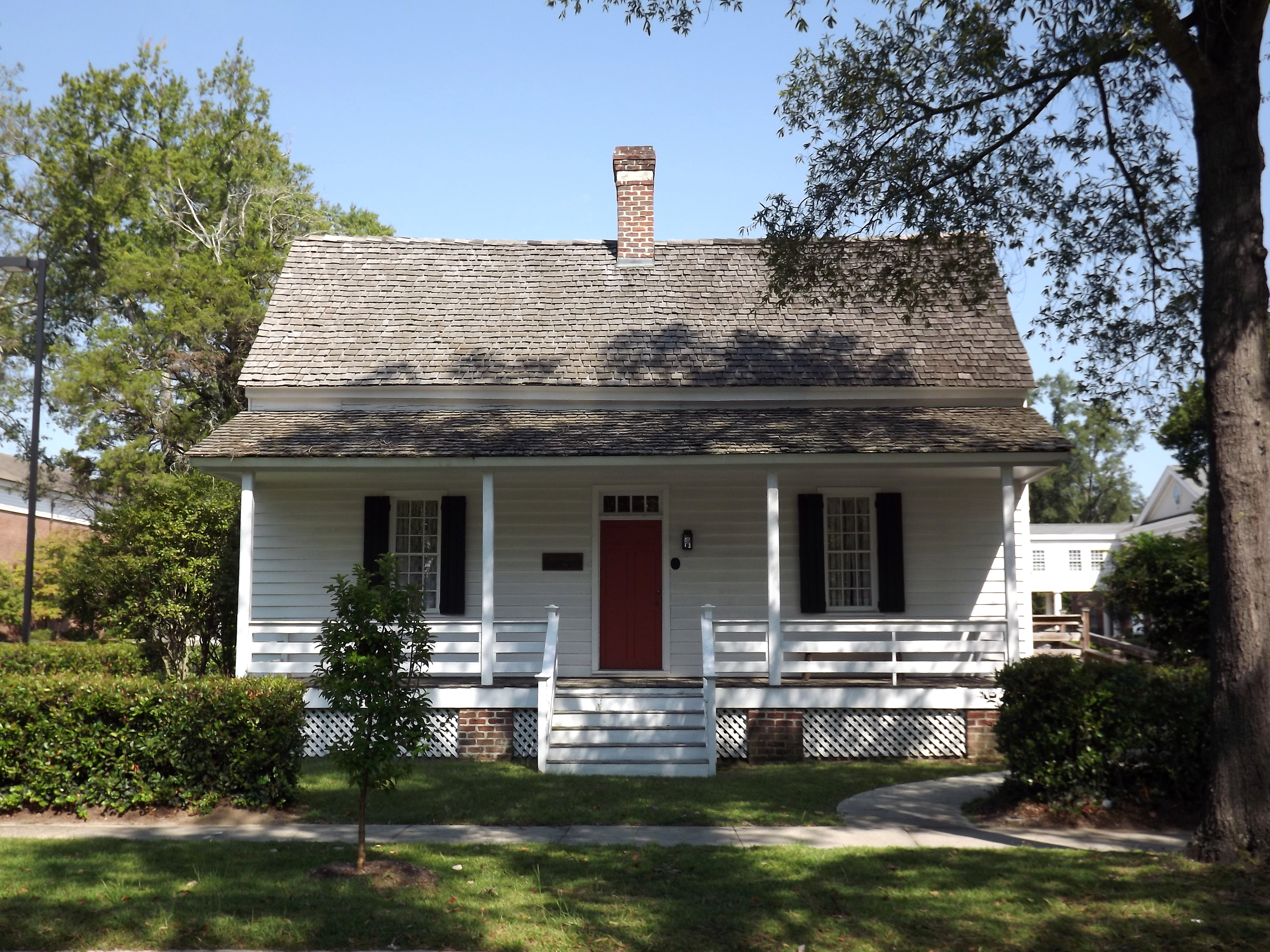
The John L. Hart House from East Home Avenue.

John L. Hart House in Hartsville, South Carolina, also known as Hart-Mills Cottage, was built in 1850. It was listed on the National Register of Historic Places in 1983. It is located in the East Home Avenue Historic District.
