= Phoebe Hart House =

Historic house in New Hampshire, United States

- U.S. National Register of Historic Places
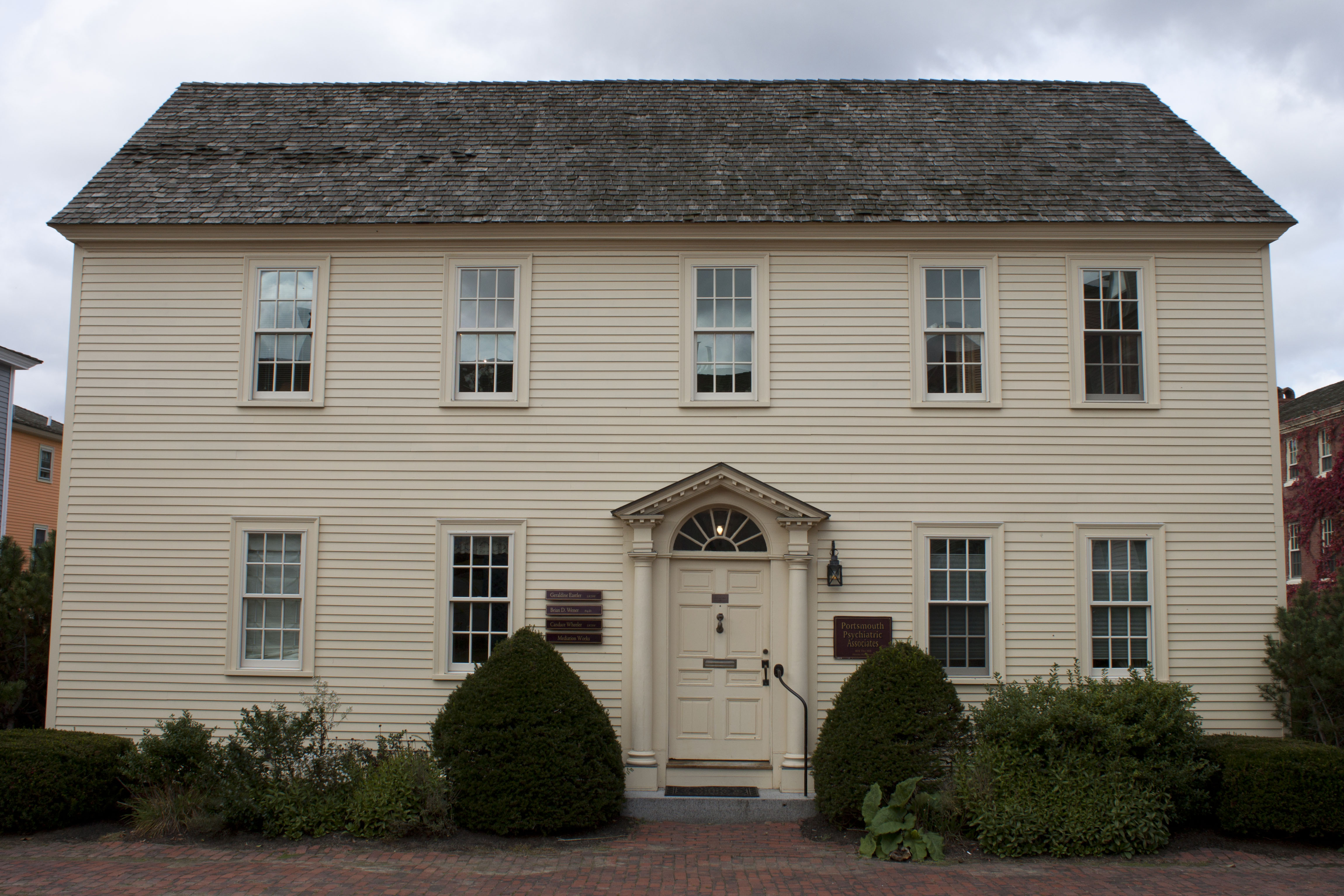

- Location within New Hampshire Location within the United States
- Location: The Hill, Portsmouth, New Hampshire
- Coordinates: 43°4′43″N 70°45′36″W
- Area: less than one acre
- Built: 1808
- Architectural style: Federal, Adamesque
- NRHP reference No.: 73000170
- Added to NRHP: April 2, 1973

The Phoebe Hart House is a historic house at The Hill in Portsmouth, New Hampshire, USA. Built about 1808–10, it is a well-preserved example of a middle-class urban Federal style house. It was listed on the National Register of Historic Places in 1973. It now houses professional offices.

== Description and history ==
The Phoebe Hart House is located on The Hill, a cluster of closely spaced historic houses on the northern edge of downtown Portsmouth, bounded on the north by Deer Street and on the east by High Street. This grouping was created by a road widening project from houses originally located on or near Deer Street. This house is located in the center of the cluster, behind the Henry Sherburne House. It is a 2 1/2-story wood-frame structure, with a gabled roof and clapboarded exterior. Its front facade is oriented to the south, toward an open plaza at the center of The Hill. The facade is five bays wide, with slightly asymmetrical placement around a centered entrance. The entrance is the most elaborate part of the facade, with attached columns and a segmented fanlight window, above which is a modillioned gable. The interior retains its original finishes, including a central circular staircase.

This house was probably built around 1808–10, the lot it originally stood on having been subdivided in 1808. The front entrance surround is one of the most unusual to survive from the Federal period in the city; it was probably based on examples published in architectural pattern books. This level of detail was also not typically found on middle-class housing of the period, of which this is an example. Originally oriented with a side gable end toward Deer Street, it was moved to its present location in the 1970s.

== See also ==
- National Register of Historic Places listings in Rockingham County, New Hampshire
