= South Carolina Governor's School for Science and Mathematics =

Public high school in South Carolina

Location
- 401 Railroad Ave; Hartsville, South Carolina 29550; United States; 34.373°N 80.065°W

Information
- Type: Public boarding school
- Established: 1988; 38 years ago
- Oversight: Board of Trustees
- CEEB code: 410997
- President: Daniel S. Dorsel
- Grades: 11–12
- Enrollment: 296 (2024–2025)
- Student to teacher ratio: 10:1
- Campus: Residential Dormitories with Labs, Classrooms, a Student Activities Center, and a Gymnasium
- Mascot: Apollo the Eagle
- Nickname: Govie
- Team name: Eagles
- Affiliation: South Carolina Department of Education; NCSSS; Coker University
- Website: www.scgssm.org

The South Carolina Governor's School for Science and Mathematics (GSSM or SCGSSM) is a public, boarding high school for students in grades 11 and 12, located in Hartsville, South Carolina. The school offers many courses in science, mathematics, and the humanities.

== Academics ==
Students at GSSM can take a wide range of STEM and humanities courses during their two years on campus. In 2026, 16 dual enrolled courses, 16 AP courses, and 39 "Above AP" courses were offered. Students can conduct semester or year-long scientific investigations, in addition to the required Summer Program for Research Interns (SPRI). During SPRI, students conduct six weeks of mentored scientific, business or economics research at university or corporate R&D labs across South Carolina, in locations across the United States, and internationally. In 2009, GSSM began the Research Exchange Scholars Program (later renamed the Research Experience Scholars Program) with exchange students from Pforzheim, Germany and Daejeon, Korea. In 2017, the RESP program included sites in Germany, Korea, and China.

GSSM offers many courses in STEM and humanities in addition to a January Interim period during which students can choose from experiential courses and national and international trips. Interim course offerings vary from year to year.

Every student is assigned a college counselor that typically has experience in college admissions. GSSM provides resources and assistance for applying to colleges and scholarships.

Alumni have received a variety of selective undergraduate and postgraduate awards, including the Morehead-Cain Scholarship, the Goldwater Scholarship, the Gates Cambridge Scholarship, and the Schwarzman Scholarship.

== Outreach ==
Beyond the education provided to students in residence, the school delivers outreach programs for middle schoolers in satellite locations statewide, as well as for rising 8th through 10th graders at its annual, residential summer program, GoSciTech.

GoSciTech, originally named Summer Science Program (SSP), began as a one-week program in 1990. As of 2012, the camp expanded to offer up to four weeks of courses and was renamed GoSciTech. In 2016, nearly 30 courses were offered to over 500 students.

Satellite camps include iTEAMS Xtreme and iTEAMS Xtreme: Next Generation, computer science, technology and robotics day camps. CREATEng, an engineering and design thinking day camp, was added in 2014. More than 1300 students and teachers from across the state participated in GSSM's summer outreach programs during the 2016 summer.

== History ==
Beginning in the late 1970s, South Carolina legislators, educators, and administrators began planning to mitigate the "brain drain" that afflicted the state. Not only did the state's most talented students leave for college and graduate school, but they remained out of state well after they had graduated. It was then decided to establish a series of Governor's Schools that would serve the state's best and brightest, and most importantly, to encourage them to remain and give back to the state. The first such school, the Governor's School for the Arts (which eventually became the South Carolina Governor's School for the Arts & Humanities), opened as an annual residential camp in 1980 at no cost to attendees.

In 1988, under the leadership of Governor Carroll Campbell and Charles W. Coker, the South Carolina General Assembly passed an Act establishing the Governor's School for Science and Mathematics on the grounds of then Coker College (now a university), one of four such schools in the country at the time. Its first class begin on August 28, 1988. The following year, the school held its first annual SPRI research colloquium featuring student research conducted over the summer.

In 2003, after fifteen years on Coker's campus, a donation from Milliken & Company of the old Hartsville Cotton Mill enabled the school to establish its own standalone campus with capacity for 130 students. In 2010, two new wings were added: the Jay Lucas Academic Center, containing classrooms and laboratories, and the Gerald R. Malloy Student Activities Center, which includes an engineering projects center and also a gym, weight room, game room, and kitchen. The school has a maximum capacity of 300 students.

== Admissions ==
Admission to GSSM is by application and open to any resident of South Carolina in their sophomore year of high school. Juniors and seniors are not eligible to apply. Applicants are invited through a competitive selection process, with about 157 invited in 2016 (varying from year to year so that the student body size at the start of each year is 288). For the 2020–2021 school year, submission of a PSAT, SAT, or ACT score was optional. Students who meet the basic requirements are typically invited for an interview in early spring. Some students are placed on a waiting list, which is pulled from if any of the originally selected students do not accept their offer of enrollment.

== Student life ==
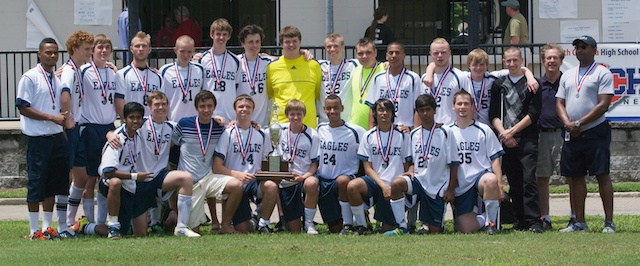
SCGSSM State Soccer Championship 2012

All students live in the dorms. Each Jack-and-Jill suite consists of two rooms and a connecting bathroom; two students live in each room. The dorms are split into two halls: James D. Daniels, named after the former Coker University president, for AMAB people; and Denny W. Neilson, named for the former South Carolina State Representative, for AFAB people. Each side has three floors (called houses). There is up to one RLC (Residence Life Coordinator) per floor. RLCs are full-time staff members that live on campus to assist the students. The RLCs are assisted by up to two RAs (Resident Assistants) who are typically college students that live at GSSM.

Much of the student body participates in the school's numerous clubs and societies. GSSM has almost 70 clubs and societies. Notable clubs include the Robotics club, Interact club, which connects students to volunteer opportunities, the Mock Trial club and Academic Team, and Common Ground, an LGBT club for queers and allies.

Students are required to complete around 100 hours of community service through their time at the school. Service projects include tutoring local students and peers, computer, website and IT help for business owners, volunteering at the animal shelter and food bank, and helping around campus.

=== Sports ===
The Governor's School fields 7 varsity men's sports (cross country, swimming, basketball, tennis, track and field, soccer, and golf), 8 varsity women's sports (cross country, swimming, volleyball, basketball, tennis, track and field, soccer, and golf), and a co-ed cheerleading team. For certain non-offered sports, such as baseball, softball, wrestling, and marching band, the school allows students to try out—and play for—neighboring Hartsville High School. Its teams have consistently ranked at a high level, winning state championships in men's soccer (2015 runners-up, 2018), women's volleyball (2016 runners-up, 2018), men's cross country (2017), and women's track and field (2019, 2026 runners-up), in addition to several regional and individual championships. The school's chess team has won 14 titles, the most in the state. The Eagles have rivalries with Dixie High School and Hartsville High School and compete in Region 5 of Class 1A in the SCHSL.

== Notable alumni ==
- Aziz Ansari – actor, comedian, and filmmaker
- Hon. Shiva Hodges – U.S. Magistrate for the District of South Carolina
- Dr. Mitch Frye – current Academic Dean of the Alabama School of Math and Science, one of SCGSSM's sister schools in Mobile, Alabama
- Lorraine Lisiecki — professor of earth sciences at the University of California, Santa Barbara.

== See also ==
- South Carolina Governor's School For The Arts & Humanities, similar program located in Greenville, SC, opened in 1999.
- South Carolina Governor's School for Agriculture at John de la Howe, similar program located in McCormick County, SC
- Alabama School of Mathematics and Science
- Arkansas School for Mathematics, Sciences, and the Arts
- Carol Martin Gatton Academy of Mathematics and Science in Kentucky
- Craft Academy for Excellence in Science and Mathematics
- Illinois Mathematics and Science Academy
- Indiana Academy for Science, Mathematics, and Humanities
- Kansas Academy of Mathematics and Science
- Louisiana School for Math, Science, and the Arts
- Maine School of Science and Mathematics
- Mississippi School for Mathematics and Science
- North Carolina School of Science and Mathematics
- Oklahoma School of Science and Mathematics
- Texas Academy of Mathematics and Science
