= Texas Academy of Mathematics and Science =

Residential school in Texas, United States

Location
- 1705 W. Sycamore Street; Denton, Texas 76201; United States; 33°12′45″N 97°09′05″W

Information
- Type: Boarding, residential, public, dual enrollment
- Established: 1987
- CEEB code: 441954
- Dean: Glênisson de Oliveira
- Grades: 11–12
- Enrollment: 374 (2015-2016)
- Campus size: Part of the University of North Texas. 869 acres (3.3 km^{2})
- Campus type: Suburban, College Town
- Colors: Green and white
- Nickname: TAMSters

The Texas Academy of Mathematics and Science (TAMS) is a two-year residential early entrance college program serving approximately 375 high school juniors and seniors at the University of North Texas. Students are admitted from every region of the state through a selective admissions process. TAMS is a member of the National Consortium for Specialized Secondary Schools of Mathematics, Science and Technology.

== History ==
TAMS was established on June 23, 1987 by the 70th Texas Legislature, in order to provide high school students an opportunity to take advanced coursework in math, science, and engineering. It was designed as a residential program at the University of North Texas for high school-aged students gifted in mathematics and science.

The establishment of this innovative program is from national concern among educators about anticipated shortages of students who would be sufficiently well prepared in mathematical and scientific problem solving. Recognizing that American youth would need to compete in an increasingly technological society, several states including Texas opted to create alternative educational programs that would attract students to the fields of mathematics and science as well as offer bright, motivated young people an accelerated education in these areas of study. TAMS differs from other state-supported residential math and science schools in that the academy offers students the opportunity to complete two years of college concurrently with the last two years of high school.

The first TAMS class arrived on August 22, 1988. This graduating Class of 1990 included 65 students, colloquially known as "TAMSters." The academy has since grown and, in recent years, the graduating classes have been as large as 185 students.

== Admissions ==
TAMS is required by "to identify exceptionally gifted and intelligent high school students at the junior and senior levels and offer them a challenging education to maximize their development".

Applicants are limited to Texas residents in high school. The admissions process for TAMS is holistic and modeled on those of most colleges. Applications are typically accepted between July and mid-May of a student's sophomore year of high school, though some freshmen apply. Multiple criteria are assessed, including middle and high school grades, the rigor of classes taken at school (particularly for mathematics classes), letters of recommendation from teachers and an academic counselor or principal, SAT scores from no later than the January of the applicant's sophomore year, and an essay. Selected applicants are then invited to interview at one of TAMS's "Interview Days." During Interview Day, applicants take algebra diagnostic tests, tour the campus, and attend group interviews. Out of more than 500 students who apply each year, only around 200 are ultimately accepted into the program.

== Academics ==
Due to the selectivity of its admissions process, TAMS has traditionally had a strong academic culture among its students. The class of 2015 alone had 66 National Merit Semifinalists out of a graduating class size of less than 200. In 2013 the average SAT score for TAMS students was 2121, the second highest of any school in Texas and tenth highest in the nation. TAMS students have placed in numerous state, national and global competitions, most notably in research-based competitions such as the Intel Talent Search and Siemens Competition. In the 2013 Siemens Foundation Competition, 2 TAMS students were named regional finalists and 17 more were recognized as semifinalists. In 2014, The Siemens Foundation awarded 7 TAMS students the placement of regional finalists, and 16 more as semifinalists; 2015 saw 16 semifinalists and 3 regionals finalists from TAMS. Most recently, 15 TAMS seniors were awarded semifinalist status in the 2016 Siemens competition; senior Prateek Kalakuntla advanced to regional finalist and subsequently national finalists status, winning $30,000 at national finals in December 2016.

=== Curriculum ===
TAMS operates wholly within the University of North Texas. TAMS students take UNT classes for their two years at TAMS, and graduate with a TAMS high school diploma as well as a UNT college transcript with a minimum of 57 hours of transferable college credits. While at TAMS, they are considered to be concurrently enrolled in high school and college, and attain a college-like experience all while living among same-age peers.

TAMS students essentially follow a college workload and schedule, and take classes alongside regular UNT students. They are officially UNT students with "TAMS" as their major. Core subjects required for graduation include biology or computer science, chemistry, physics (mechanics and electromagnetism), mathematics (precalculus and calculus), English literature, US history, and political science. All courses are UNT university courses and taught by UNT faculty and professors. A wide variety of elective courses may be taken in addition to required classes after the first semester. Students are also required to attend a weekly seminar on Monday afternoons, which includes various presentations covering academic topics like research opportunities and non-academic topics.

All core courses must be taken at TAMS/UNT during the fall and spring semesters, though some elective courses may be taken during the summer. The minimum cumulative GPA required for graduation is 3.0. Students whose GPA drops below this threshold are put on academic probation, and may be dismissed from the academy. During the first semester only, the minimum GPA that a student can have is 2.7. Students whose GPA is below this value will be dismissed within the first semester. Students who have a GPA between 2.7 and 3.0 will be placed on academic probation for the following semester.

=== Tuition and fees ===
TAMS students are responsible for paying for room and board in McConnell Hall and a mandatory UNT meal plan every semester, as well as a yearly $2,500 program charge and approximately $5,500 tuition fees (after scholarship is applied). About thirty percent of students receive financial aid through programs such as FAFSA to defray costs. Funding for TAMS is provided through a special appropriations bill and with support from the Foundation School Fund.

=== Research, scholarships, and awards ===
Students at TAMS are encouraged to take the opportunity of conducting research under the guidance of a professor either on or off-campus during the school year as well as during the summer. The TAMS Summer Research Scholarship is offered to about 60 students per year to fund these research pursuits; students performing research throughout the summer typically commit 30 to 40 hours per week to the lab. Students' research are often recognized by professors listing a student as co-author of a papers or by awards at competitions such as Siemens Westinghouse Competition in Science and Technology and the Intel Science Talent Search. From 1999 to 2016, TAMS students were named semifinalists 84 times in the talent search and finalists 11 times. This was tied the fifth most finalists of any school during this period. A number of students also compete for the Barry M. Goldwater Scholarship as university students. TAMS students are frequently quite successful in the competition; in 2016, all four TAMS students nominated by the University of North Texas won the scholarship, making UNT one of the few universities in the country to achieve this feat.

In 2012, while attending TAMS, Monica Thieu became the youngest person ever to win the Jeopardy! College Championship.

== Student life ==
TAMS students have created an unofficial Wiki page which has more information regarding student life at TAMS. This page is primarily maintained by current TAMS students.

Because they are technically considered students at the University of North Texas, TAMS students enjoy all of the same benefits as other UNT students including access to and usage of university cafeterias, libraries, recreational facilities and participation in UNT-sponsored activities and competitions. An exception to this is a nightly curfew (see below).

=== McConnell Hall ===
All TAMS students live in McConnell Hall. In the program's early days, TAMS students shared the building with regular UNT students before the program grew too large to share its dormitory with other students. McConnell Hall, originally built in 1961 as an all-female dormitory, consists of four wings (the hall originally had three before a major expansion in 1990) and three floors, segregated by gender and grade level. The hall is furnished with a kitchenette, multiple meeting rooms, laundry rooms, bathrooms and two common rooms. One of the common rooms, the Smitty Study, serves as a public recreation room when it is not functioning as a study area during quiet hours. The other common room, Mac Café, aptly named because it once was home to a university cafeteria, hosts various student activities and serves as a gathering place for both academic and social interaction.

Students reside in pairs in any one of the hall's 374 dual-occupancy dormitories, each of which includes two beds, dressers and drawers, desks, a sink, internet access and electrical sockets; some rooms contain a private toilet and shower, while others share a bathroom with adjacent rooms. Community bathrooms are available for the remaining rooms. Because all TAMS students live in the same building and in close proximity, TAMS tends to be a very close-knit community. While students can, for the most part, schedule their own day however they wish, all students have a curfew and must remain inside the hall from 11 p.m. (1.00 a.m. on Friday and Saturday nights) to 6 a.m. without special permission. Enforcement includes nightly check-ins with resident assistants, who are regular undergraduate students at UNT. However, students may submit requests to be absent overnight or past curfew.

=== Volunteering ===
The TAMS program allows students to find volunteering opportunities within the Denton, Texas area. Most volunteering activities are coordinated through numerous clubs and organizations within the program as well as through student life. TAMS students participate throughout the academic year. Volunteering ranges from, but not limited to grade school tutoring, hospital and nursing home volunteering, participating in Denton environmental clean up, hosting UNT sponsored charity auctions and service events, etc. Students have also established non-profit start up programs that promote volunteering within the Denton community. PCS 2 Prosper is one of the many notable organizations that have been founded by TAMS students. Volunteers collect donated computers and laptops from the community and some companies, and distributes them to schools and homes in need after repairing and renovating them.

Forward Tutoring is a prominent non-profit start up created by TAMS students with the mission to build a community of mentors and tutors. It is known to be an online tutoring service in which TAMS students volunteer their time to schools in need of academic aid. Student who seek this aid in turn participate in community services for other non-profit organizations. The organization gained recognition for its program and was able to receive a grant in 2011 from the Murphy Entrepreneurship after a generally well received beta launch.

Many students participate in yearly or more frequent events such as proms, school dances, talent shows, coffee houses, and an annual homecoming dance. Frequent workshops featuring guest speakers (often TAMS alumni) are also held for TAMS students covering a variety of topics, from college admissions to working in the industry. College visits take place on a regular basis as well.

== Notable alumni ==
- Edward Boyden, American neuroscientist
- Robert Rohde, American physicist
- Adam Smith, co-founder of Xobni
- Alice Ting, American chemist
- David Williams, poker player
- Nora Zehetner, actress
- Sujal Parikh, global health advocate
- Ryan Baker, American education researcher
- Prince Jones
- Tiffany Moon, Season 5 cast member of The Real Housewives of Dallas
- Austin Hansley, Attorney at Law, Bachelor of Science Electrical Engineering, appeared in more patent litigation cases than any other attorney or law firm in the United States in 2015. See,
- Kathryn Huff, Assistant Secretary of Energy for Nuclear Energy

== See also ==
- Alabama School of Mathematics and Science
- Arkansas School for Mathematics, Sciences, and the Arts
- Carol Martin Gatton Academy of Mathematics and Science in Kentucky
- Craft Academy for Excellence in Science and Mathematics
- Illinois Mathematics and Science Academy
- Indiana Academy for Science, Mathematics, and Humanities
- Kansas Academy of Mathematics and Science
- Louisiana School for Math, Science, and the Arts
- Maine School of Science and Mathematics
- Mississippi School for Mathematics and Science
- North Carolina School of Science and Mathematics
- Oklahoma School of Science and Mathematics
- South Carolina Governor's School for Science and Mathematics
