= Carol Martin Gatton Academy of Mathematics and Science in Kentucky =

School in Bowling Green, Kentucky, United States

The Gatton Academy of Mathematics and Science
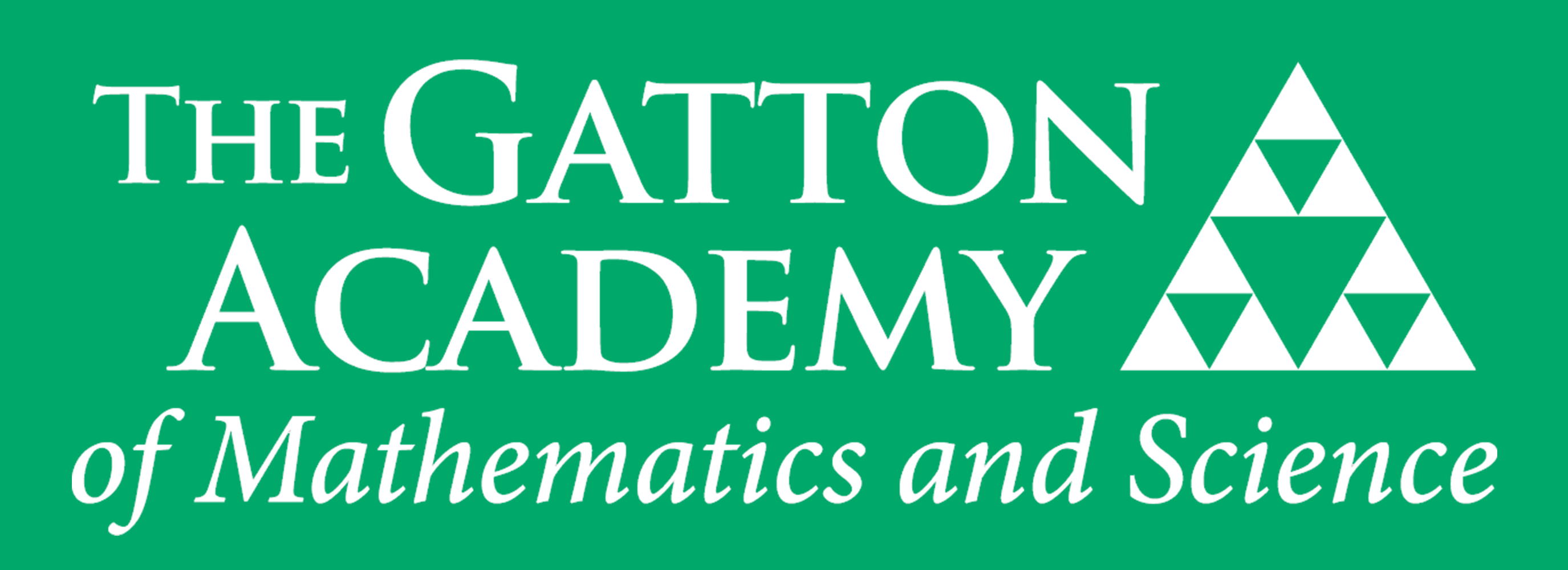

Location
- 1509 College Heights Blvd. #71031; Bowling Green, Warren, Kentucky 42101; United States; 36°59′13″N 86°27′16″W

Information
- Type: Public, boarding, dual enrollment
- Motto: Infinite Possibilities
- Established: 2007
- Founder: Julia Link Roberts
- CEEB code: 180296
- Director: Derick Strode
- Grades: 11–12
- Colors: Green, silver and white
- Mascot: Sierpiński Triangle and Sir Pinski the Fighting Automaton
- Rival: Craft Academy
- National ranking: 1 (Newsweek 2012, Daily Beast 2012, 2013, 2014)
- Tuition: $0
- Website: wku.edu/academy

The Carol Martin Gatton Academy of Mathematics and Science in Kentucky, often called the Gatton Academy of Mathematics and Science or just the Gatton Academy, is a public academy and an early college entrance program funded by the state of Kentucky and located on the campus of Western Kentucky University in Bowling Green. Approximately 200 students attend the Gatton Academy during their junior and senior years of high school. They earn at least 60 college credit hours before graduating and receive an Associate Degree of Interdisciplinary Studies from Western Kentucky University upon graduation.

== History ==
The Gatton Academy opened in 2007 after 10 years of planning, including the retrofitting of Florence Schneider Hall on the campus of Western Kentucky University to accommodate both the Academy and the Western Kentucky University Center for Gifted Studies, both of which were to be directed by Julia Link Roberts. The Academy was largely supported by a donation from Carol Martin "Bill" Gatton, a Kentucky-born entrepreneur and philanthropist known for his contributions to higher education.

The Gatton Academy has had students attend from 118 of Kentucky's 120 counties. The only counties to never send a student to the Gatton Academy are Letcher and Robertson.

== Admissions ==
Applicants to the Gatton Academy of Mathematics and Science must be Kentucky resident high school sophomores who complete Geometry and Algebra I/II prior to their enrollment in addition to scoring a minimum of 22 on the math section of the ACT or 540 on the math section of the SAT. Applicants offered an opportunity to interview will be required to take a placement exam during the day of their interview, which determines the math class they are enrolled in during their first semester.

Students are selected for admission based on standardized test scores, academic grades from their freshman and sophomore years, interest in advanced careers in STEM fields, responses to application essay questions, interviews by Gatton Academy staff, and recommendations from teachers and other individuals who can attest to the student's ability to succeed in the program.

Approximately 350 Kentucky high school sophomores apply to the Gatton Academy every year. Roughly 150 are offered an opportunity to interview, and approximately 95 students, half male and half female, are offered the opportunity to enroll.

== Academics ==
Gatton Academy students complete coursework dual-enrolled at Western Kentucky University. The Academy's location on campus allows students to physically attend lectures and lab classes alongside university students.

All Gatton Academy students are required to complete coursework in trigonometry, calculus, biology, chemistry, physics, and computer science by graduation. They must complete one course in all of biology, chemistry, physics, and computer science, in addition to choosing one of those subjects to take a second, higher-level "sequence" course in. Gatton Academy students must earn math credits up to and including Calculus II.

In order to receive a Gatton Academy diploma, a student must:

- Complete a required 12 core STEM courses with a grade of C or better during the two-year period of study.
- Complete all additional courses with a grade of C or better.
- Maintain a cumulative GPA of 2.75 or better.
- Meet all pre-college curriculum requirements.

In addition to the STEM curriculum offered by the Gatton Academy, students must fulfill pre-college requirements as mandated by the Kentucky Department of Education. These requirements may include courses in English, world history or United States history, physical education, visual or performing arts, or foreign languages. Gatton Academy students are able to participate in the STEM+ Global Studies program, which entails enrolling in one course every semester in their chosen language: American Sign Language, Chinese, German, Russian, Japanese, or Spanish. Gatton Academy students who participate in STEM+ Global Studies often apply for competitive programs, such as the National Security Language Initiative for Youth.

Most of the school's graduates attend four-year colleges (67% of graduates attend either Western Kentucky University, the University of Kentucky or the University of Louisville), while some chose to pursue other opportunities during gap years. In 2019, Gatton Academy students scored an average of 32.6 composite on the ACT, the highest in Kentucky ahead of fellow dual-enrollment program the Craft Academy (29.6) and Louisville public magnet duPont Manual High School (26.6).

=== Research ===
Gatton Academy students are encouraged to participate in research, both during the academic year and through research internships during the summer. During the summer between their junior and senior years, Gatton Academy students are eligible to apply for a grant which funds their ability to be on-campus during the summer and engage in research. Past students have used their research experience at the Gatton Academy to apply for awards such as the Regeneron Science Talent Search and the Goldwater Scholarship.

=== Study abroad ===
The Gatton Academy offers study abroad experiences in Costa Rica and England. The former study abroad awards credit for a biology course, while the latter awards credit for an English course that many Gatton Academy students require to fulfill state graduation requirements. The Costa Rica trip includes visits to the Goldring-Gund Marine Biology Field Station in Playa Grande, the Cloudbridge Nature Reserve in Cordillera de Talamanca, Corcovado National Park, and Isla del Caño. The England trip includes visits to the homes of well-known English authors (such as Shakespeare and Jane Austen) and Stonehenge. Throughout the trip, students live at Wroxton Abbey in Wroxton, Oxfordshire, as well as spending time in the Lake District and London.

== Student life ==
Gatton Academy students are able to participate in residential programming, workshops, retreats, weekend programming and other special events, extra-curricular activities and recreation, and leadership and service opportunities. Residential counselors and other Academy staff members sponsor clubs and organizations that cater to students' interests. Students who are interested in musical, vocal, dramatic, or other arts may audition for performance groups and societies at Western Kentucky University. Students may not rush for a social fraternity or sorority.

=== Florence Schneider Hall ===
Originally built in 1929, the Gatton Academy and the Western Kentucky University Center for Gifted Studies began to use Florence Schneider Hall for operations in 2007. The building offers various common spaces for study and socialization. The building regularly hosts guests: past guests have included Kentucky governors Steve and Andy Beshear, lieutenant governor Jenean Hampton, and congressman Brett Guthrie.

== See also ==
- Alabama School of Mathematics and Science
- Arkansas School for Mathematics, Sciences, and the Arts
- Craft Academy for Excellence in Science and Mathematics
- Illinois Mathematics and Science Academy
- Indiana Academy for Science, Mathematics, and Humanities
- Kansas Academy of Mathematics and Science
- Louisiana School for Math, Science, and the Arts
- Maine School of Science and Mathematics
- Mississippi School for Mathematics and Science
- North Carolina School of Science and Mathematics
- Oklahoma School of Science and Mathematics
- South Carolina Governor's School for Science and Mathematics
- Texas Academy of Mathematics and Science
