= Kansas Academy of Mathematics and Science =

Coordinates: 38°52′15″N 99°20′27″W

Location
- 600 Park Street; Hays, Kansas 67601; United States

Information
- Established: 2006
- Website: www.fhsu.edu/kams/

The Kansas Academy of Mathematics and Science (KAMS) is a two-year, residential, early-entrance-to-college program for U.S. high school juniors and seniors who are academically talented in the areas of mathematics and science. Located on the Fort Hays State University campus in Hays, Kansas, students concurrently complete their last two years of high school, while earning over 60 college credits.

== History ==
The Kansas Academy of Mathematics and Science was established by legislative action in 2006 by the Kansas Legislature. The establishment of this program stemmed from national concern regarding anticipated shortages of students who would be sufficiently well prepared in mathematical and scientific problem solving. Recognizing that American youth would need to compete in an increasingly technological global society, Kansas is the 16th state to create alternative educational programs that would attract students to the fields of mathematics and science as well as offer young students an accelerated education in these areas of study.

Fort Hays State University, part of the Kansas Board of Regents system, was chosen to host the academy after a bid process. In August 2009, KAMS opened its doors to the first class of 26 students.

== Academics ==
=== Admissions process ===
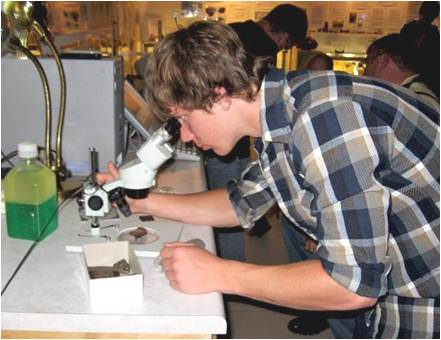
A KAMS student studies meteorites at the Kansas Meteorite Museum.

Information sessions throughout the state and a preview day on the FHSU campus occur in the fall, and completed applications are asked to be completed by April 1, but includes a rolling deadline. KAMS selects at most 40 students per year for each class.

=== Curriculum ===
KAMS students are expected to earn over 60 college credit hours over the two-year academic program. Students must complete both years to successfully complete the program.

=== Research requirement ===
All KAMS students are required to engage in a research project to successfully complete the program.

== Student life ==
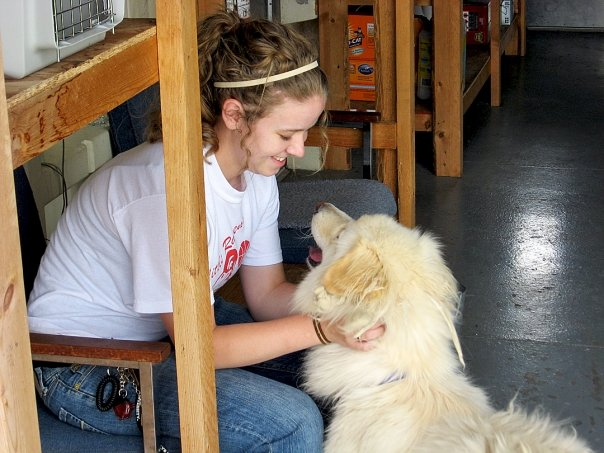
A KAMS student volunteering at the local Humane Society.

=== Residential living ===
As a residential program, students live in Custer Hall on the FHSU campus that has been designated for Academy students.

== See also ==
- Alabama School of Mathematics and Science
- Arkansas School for Mathematics, Sciences, and the Arts
- Carol Martin Gatton Academy of Mathematics and Science in Kentucky
- Craft Academy for Excellence in Science and Mathematics
- Illinois Mathematics and Science Academy
- Indiana Academy for Science, Mathematics, and Humanities
- Louisiana School for Math, Science, and the Arts
- Maine School of Science and Mathematics
- Mississippi School for Mathematics and Science
- North Carolina School of Science and Mathematics
- Oklahoma School of Science and Mathematics
- South Carolina Governor's School for Science and Mathematics
- Texas Academy of Mathematics and Science
