= Illinois Mathematics and Science Academy =

Illinois Mathematics and Science Academy (IMSA)

Location
- 1500 Sullivan Road; Aurora, Illinois 60506; United States; 41°47′13″N 88°21′17″W

Information
- Type: Selective, Public High School; Boarding school
- Established: July 18, 1985; 41 years ago
- Founder: Leon Lederman
- CEEB code: 140177
- NCES School ID: 170010105114
- President: Evan M. Glazer
- Chair: Eric Brown
- Principal: Angela Rowley
- Grades: 10–12
- Gender: Coeducational
- Enrollment: 630 (2023–24)
- Campus type: Suburban
- Colors: Navy and Pacific blue.
- Athletics conference: Little Ten Conference
- Mascot: Titans
- Accreditation: Cognia (education)
- Newspaper: The Acronym
- Yearbook: Gallimaufry
- Website: www.imsa.edu

The Illinois Mathematics and Science Academy, or IMSA, is a three-year residential public secondary education institution in Aurora, Illinois, United States, with an enrollment of approximately 650 students.

Enrollment is generally offered to incoming sophomores, although younger students who have had the equivalent of one year of algebra and a 9th-grade science equivalent are eligible to apply. All applicants undergo a competitive admissions process involving the review of transcripts, teacher and counselor evaluations, student essays, and SAT or ACT scores. Historically, approximately one-third of applicants in any given year are admitted. Due to its nature as a public institution, there are no charges related to tuition, room, and board; however, there is an annual student fee that may be reduced or waived based on family income.

Most people accepted to IMSA live in the state of Illinois; however, a limited number of out-of-staters are accepted each year. They are primarily from neighboring states, such as Wisconsin, Indiana, and Kentucky.

== History ==
The school's founding president was former Batavia Superintendent Stephanie Pace Marshall, who was involved with the project from the start and, with the school's first legal counsel Richard L. Horwitz, helped form IMSA's original legislation, governing bylaws, and slogan. Marshall retired from the position on June 30, 2007, and was later named President Emerita by the Board of Trustees.

Although the school received a budget cut in financial year 2002, its budget has since increased with the support of House Minority Leader Tom Cross. IMSA's chairperson was Paula Olszewski-Kubilius.

== Admission ==
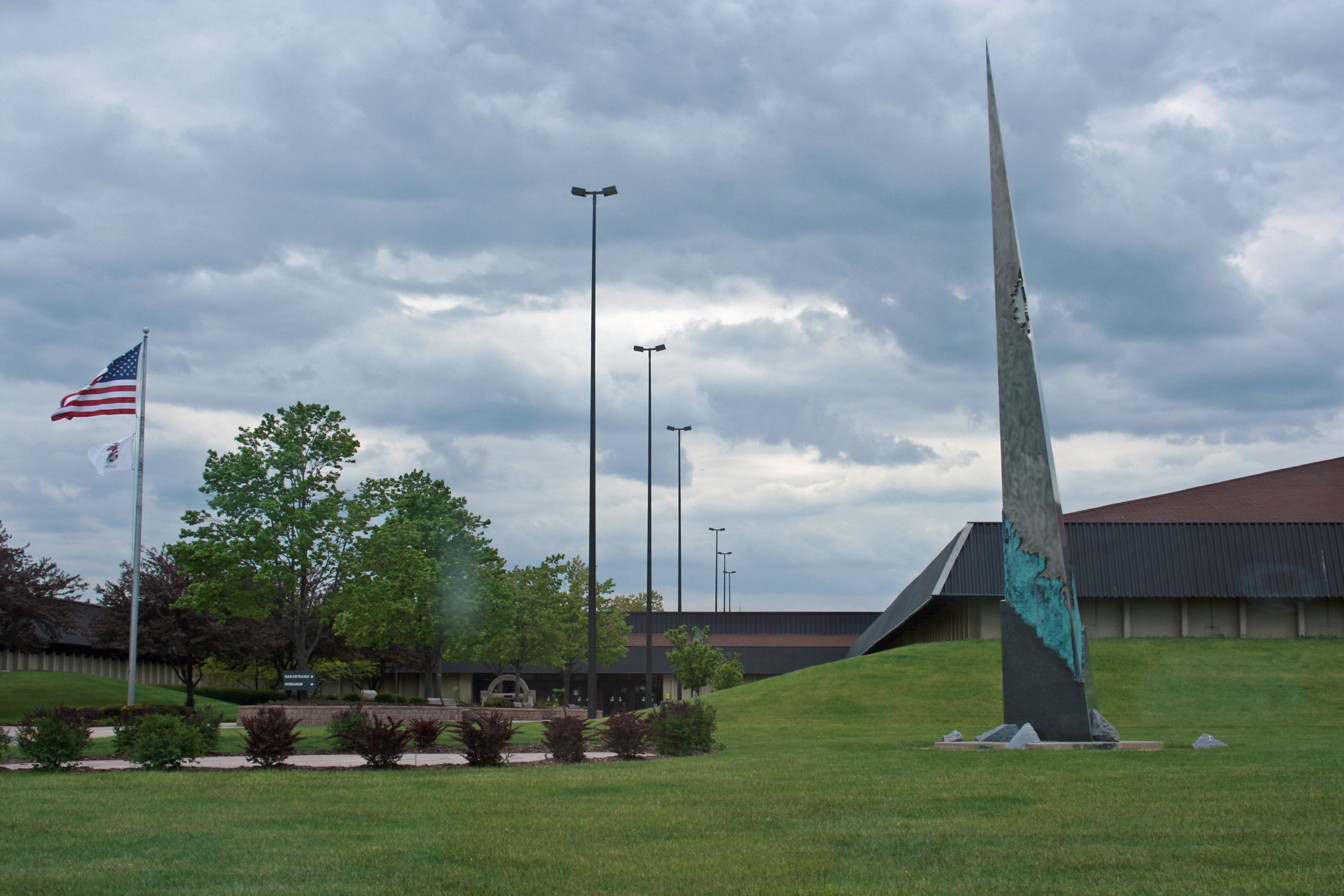
Front entrance

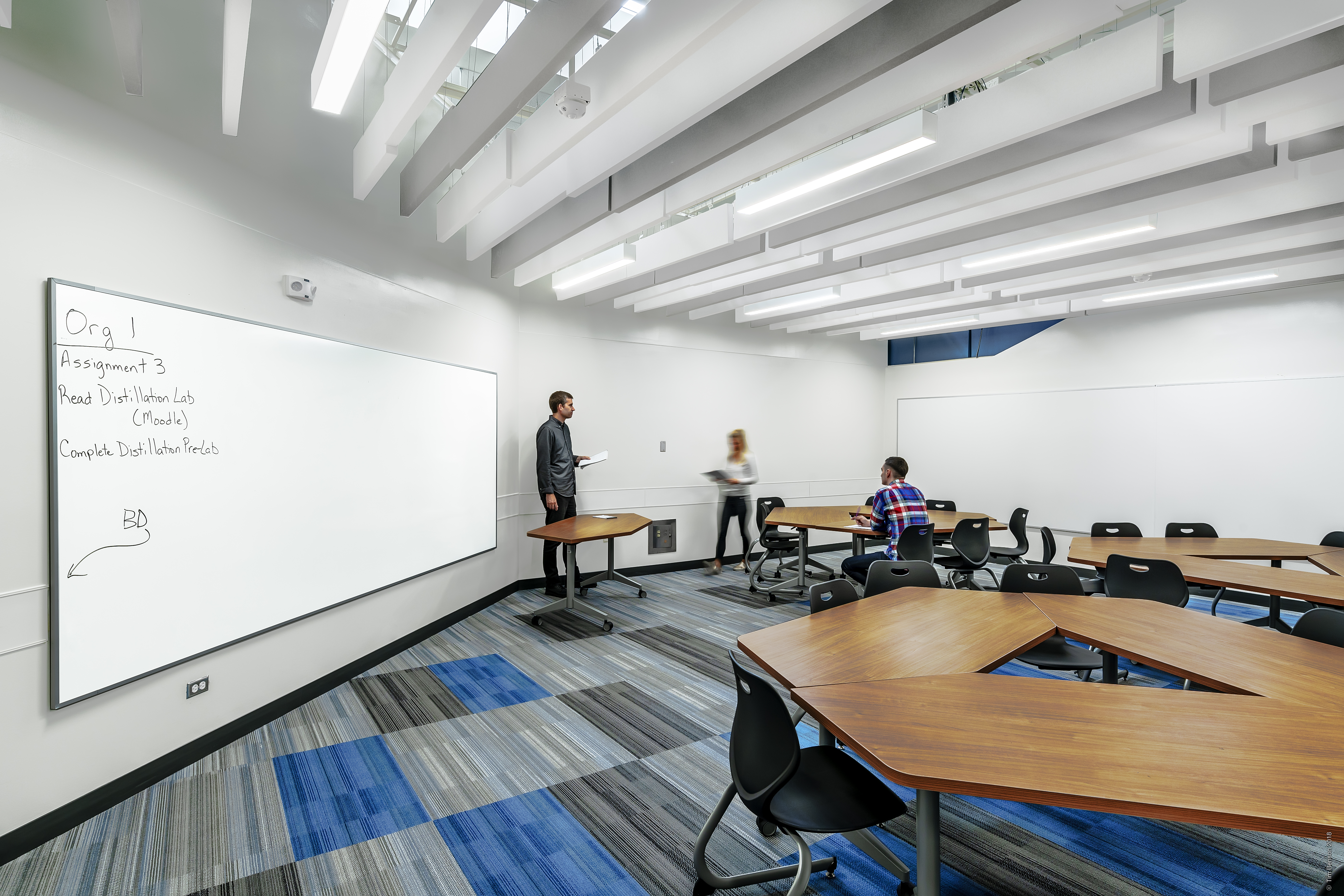
B-Wing Science Lab Classroom at IMSA

Prospective students, who are usually freshmen in high school but in some cases may be eighth graders, must complete an application to be considered for admission to IMSA.

The application process consists of an official transcript of the student's last 2½ years of school, scores from the SAT or ACT, two student essays, three teacher evaluations in science, mathematics, and English, and a list of awards and extracurricular activities.

=== Historic admission statistics ===
Admission statistics
Class	Number of students invited	Number of students graduated	Average incoming SAT CR (or verbal) score	Average incoming SAT math score
2016	241	206	610	678
2015	242	195	611	678
2014	242	198	598	672
2013	224	N/A	612	675
2012	252	212	581	650
2011	253	199	577	637
2010	231	177	587	652
2009	242	201	594	634
2008	242	204	595	644
2007	253	203	587	652
2006	240	184	601	649
2005	?	208	588	639
2004	246	199	590	638
2003	230	189	601	648
2002	220	177	595	650
2001	?	224	?	?
2000	?	191	?	?
1999	?	187	?	?
1998	?	?	?	?
1997	230	?	525	637

In order to draw greater numbers of applications and "transform teaching and learning," IMSA has an outreach program run by the Center for Teaching and Learning (formerly known as The Center for Advancement and Renewal of Learning and Teaching (The Center@IMSA), then "Professional Field Services (PFS)"). Some students who are invited to attend IMSA are admitted on the condition that they successfully complete a three-week, intensive preparation course, known as EXCEL, over the summer. IMSA has a fairly low retention rate; the average retention rate per class is 85%. The reasons for this may include the difficulty of the IMSA curriculum, homesickness, disciplinary expulsion, students' families moving out of state, and the inability of Illinois students to matriculate to IMSA after their sophomore year.

== Academics ==
Students at IMSA take rigorous college preparatory courses, with all classes being taught at the honors level, though IMSA philosophically spurns the Advanced Placement curriculum. Each student must fulfill a set of specific credits in order to graduate. This set of credits is broken down by academic subject. Each semester-long class counts for 0.5 credits, unless it meets with greater-than-normal frequency.

In addition to the academic program, IMSA also offers a large number clubs ranging from religious clubs to volunteer organizations. All these clubs are chartered by the Student Council and the Council for Campus Equity (CCE).

Student Inquiry and Research

Most Wednesdays are "I Days" (for "inquiry") and are usually reserved for juniors and seniors to research in the SIR program. SIR also runs during the summer for sophomores and juniors, allowing a student to conduct four disparate investigations.

== External programs ==
Unlike many other secondary schools, IMSA runs extracurricular and summer programs for the teachers and students of the State of Illinois. The Center for Teaching and Learning (CTL) is the division of the academy that directs and manages programs serving Illinois Educators and Students. CTL offerings enable students to develop and sustain Science, Technology, Engineering, and Mathematics (STEM) skills. CTL Student offerings include the IMSA Fusion program, Summer@IMSA, Funshop student enrichment programs, an online research course (RISE) open to all Illinois students, ALLIES (selected High School students who lead and facilitate inquiry-based STEM programs), and a variety of online learning experiences. CTL Educator offerings include professional development to include IMSA Core Competencies, IMSA Fusion (Offering professional development for educators teaching the FUSION after-school program), and the annual "IMSA Teacher Institute Day" for local Mathematics and Science educators. All CTL Programs place a special emphasis on students who are historically underrepresented and underserved in math and science. Uniquely, the Center for Teaching and Learning also operates a field office in the Metro-east area.

== Student life ==
=== Publications ===
The Acronym is IMSA's student-run general affairs newspaper. In the 2008–2009 school year The Acronym ceased paper publishing and transitioned to an online format. The Acronym also publishes yearly Back to School editions and Senior Editions at the beginning and end of the school year, respectively. Since its inception, The Acronym has had the participation of more than 400 writers. In the 2022-2023 academic year, The Acronym reintroduced printed editions while maintaining its online articles. Additionally, it launched its mobile application that same year.

=== Athletics ===
IMSA is a member of the Illinois High School Association (IHSA), the organization that governs most sports and competitive activities in the state of Illinois, and began competing in the Little Ten Conference, a subdivision of the IHSA, during the 2021–2022 school year. IMSA's sports teams are stylized as the Titans.

The school sponsors interscholastic teams for young men and women in basketball, cross country, golf, soccer, swimming & diving, tennis, track & field, and volleyball. Young women may also compete in badminton. While not sponsored by the IHSA, the school also sponsors a dance team for young men and women.

=== Competitive activities ===
The following teams have finished in the top four of their respective IHSA sponsored state championship tournament:

- Chess: 4th place (1997–98, 1998–99, 2009–1); 3rd place (1990–91, 1994–95, 2003–04, 2004–05, 2015–16); 2nd place (1989–90); State Champions (1986–87, 1987–88, 1995–96, 1996–97, 2016–17, 2017–18)
- Scholastic Bowl: 4th place (1991–92, 2014–15); 3rd place (2009–10, 2015–16, 2017–18, 2018–19); 2nd place (1992–93); State Champions (1988–89, 1989–90, 1993–94, 1995–96, 1996–97, 1997–98, 1998–99, 2000–01, 2010–11, 2011–12, 2013–14, 2016–17, 2021-2022)

== Student Leadership and Development (SLD) Programs ==
=== Student Council ===
In addition to its primary role as the mediator between administrators and students, Student Council works with administrators to change aspects of the Academy. The Student Council website provides the student body relevant information about projects that the council is working on. Student Council also charters clubs at the beginning of each academic year and provides them with the necessary funds to hold various events. Student Council works throughout the year to collect student feedback and use that information to make changes that reflect the intentions of the student body.

== Awards ==
IMSA consistently ranks at the top of the nation in standardized test scores (of roughly 200 students in the senior class, about 50 are National Merit Semifinalists), as well as in the prestigious Siemens and Intel Science competitions. In the class of 2009, five students were named Siemens Regional Finalists and ten others as semifinalists.

Six mathematics teachers have been honored with the Edyth May Sliffe Award: Titu Andreescu (1994), Ronald Vavrinek (1995), Micah Fogel (2001), Steven Condie (2002), Michael Keyton (2003), Don Porzio (2004), and Steven Condie (2nd award) (2007). Asteroid 21441 Stevencondie is named after Dr. Condie.

Dr. Lee Eysturlid was honored with a University of Chicago Outstanding Educator Award (2020).

== Notable alumni ==
- Ramez Naam (1990) - software developer and author. He helped develop Microsoft's Internet Explorer and Outlook.
- Steven Johnson (1991) - Professor of Applied Mathematics and Physics at MIT.
- Scott Gaudi (1991) - Exoplanet hunter and Professor of Astronomy at Ohio State University.
- Robert McCool (1991) - software developer who wrote the original NCSA HTTPd web server, the predecessor of the Apache HTTP Server.
- Dominic Armato (1993) - voice actor, known for the Monkey Island video game series.
- Michael Damian Thomas (1992) - co-publisher and co-editor-in-chief of Uncanny Magazine and a multiple Hugo Award winner.
- Noah Rosenberg (1993) - population geneticist and Stanford Professor in Population Genetics and Society.
- Yu Pan (1995) - one of the six co-creators of PayPal and was the first employee at YouTube.
- Sam Yagan (1995) - one of the co-founders of SparkNotes and has also co-founded OkCupid, one of the largest (free) web-based online dating sites in the world.
- Nathan Gettings (1995) - co-founder of Palantir Technologies and founder of the robotics company Robotex.
- Russel Simmons (1995) - co-founder of Yelp and an early employee of PayPal.
- Steve Chen (Technically an alumnus since he attended IMSA, but left before he graduated)(1996) - co-founder/Chief Technology Officer of YouTube, and an early engineer at PayPal.
- Clara Shih (2000) - bestselling author of The Facebook Era, co-founder of Hearsay Social, and member of Starbucks' Board of Directors.
- Yogesh Raut (2001) - 2-time winner of Jeopardy! Masters (2025, 2026)
- Jared Kaplan (2001) - co-founder and Chief Science Officer of Anthropic.
- Sabrina Gonzalez Pasterski (2010) - prominent theoretical physicist who studies high energy physics at Harvard University.
- Tay Zonday - musician and internet personality, known for "Chocolate Rain"; attended IMSA but left before graduating.
- Eva Liu (2001 – 2023) was murdered near Neuschwanstein castle in Germany, while she was on a trip to Europe to celebrate her BS at the University of Illinois at Urbana-Champaign.

== See also ==
- University Laboratory High School
- Alabama School of Mathematics and Science
- Arkansas School for Mathematics, Sciences, and the Arts
- Carol Martin Gatton Academy of Mathematics and Science in Kentucky
- Craft Academy for Excellence in Science and Mathematics
- Indiana Academy for Science, Mathematics, and Humanities
- Kansas Academy of Mathematics and Science
- Louisiana School for Math, Science, and the Arts
- Maine School of Science and Mathematics
- Mississippi School for Mathematics and Science
- North Carolina School of Science and Mathematics
- Oklahoma School of Science and Mathematics
- South Carolina Governor's School for Science and Mathematics
- Texas Academy of Mathematics and Science
