= Oklahoma School of Science and Mathematics =

Coordinates: 35°28′48″N 97°30′19″W

Location
- 1141 North Lincoln Boulevard; Oklahoma City, Oklahoma 73104; United States

Information
- Type: Public Boarding School
- Established: 1983 (43 years ago)
- CEEB code: 372684
- President: Tony Cornforth
- Grades: 11–12
- Gender: Co-ed
- Enrollment: 175
- Campus size: 32 acres
- Affiliations: NCSSS
- Website: https://www.ossm.edu/

The Oklahoma School of Science and Mathematics (OSSM) is a two-year, public residential high school located in Oklahoma City, Oklahoma. Established by the Oklahoma state legislature in 1983, the school was designed to educate academically gifted high school juniors and seniors in advanced mathematics and science. OSSM opened doors to its inaugural class in 1990. It is a member of the National Consortium of Secondary STEM Schools (NCSSS).

== History ==
Dr. Earl Mitchell is credited as the originator of the idea of starting OSSM. He was reportedly inspired by a letter about the North Carolina School of Science and Mathematics (NCSSM), written by North Carolina governor Jim Hunt. In 1982, Dr. Mitchell travelled to NCSSM to study their practices, and enlisted Speaker Dan Draper, Representative Penny Williams, and Senator Bernice Shedrick to help bring the idea to fruition.

OSSM was established by HB 1286 in 1983, during the 39th Oklahoma Legislature. The bill's principal authors included Representative Penny Williams, Senator Bernice Shedrick, and Senator Rodger Randle. The bill was signed into law by Governor George Nigh on June 23, 1983.

In 1988, Dr. Edna Manning was appointed the first president of OSSM. Manning aided in the building and development of the institution, supervising the selection of faculty and the development of the curriculum.

When OSSM's inaugural class was accepted in 1990, the school did not have its own campus yet. Students were temporarily housed in OU's Cross Center dormitory in Norman, and took daily shuttle buses to the OU Health Sciences Center (OUHSC) campus in Oklahoma City for their classes. In 1992, OSSM moved into the newly-renovated Lincoln Elementary School, across the street from the OUHSC. During Dr. Manning's tenure as president, the school's campus grew to include a dormitory, a gymnasium, a library, and a science building.

In 2006, Chesapeake Energy gifted OSSM $500,000 to fund an endowed faculty chair in geophysics, the first endowed chair at an Oklahoma public high school.

In June 2012, Dr. Manning retired from her position as president, and was succeeded by Dr. Frank Y.H. Wang. During his tenure, Dr. Wang increased contributions to the OSSM Foundation Faculty Endowment from $4.2 million to $10 million.

On May 31, 2013, the 54th Oklahoma Legislature passed SB 1131, authored by Senator Clark Jolley, and signed into law by Governor Mary Fallin. The bill allows OSSM to accept out-of-state students for up to 10 percent of the student population and charge them tuition. It also allows the school to rent out its facilities, and create summer programs & workshops for which tuition and fees could be charged. Dr. Wang helped create the bill in an effort to generate a new revenue stream, to make up for money lost to severe cuts in state funding.

In June 2021, Dr. Wang announced he will retire at the end of the 2021-22 school year. After Wang's retirement, founding president Edna Manning returned to OSSM to serve as interim president for the 2022-2023 school year, until the succession of Tony Cornforth, OSSM's third president, to the role in June 2023.

Tony Cornforth was unanimously selected by the OSSM board as the school’s third president. At the time of his appointment, Cornforth’s highest awarded degree was a 2002 master’s degree in mathematics from the University of Oklahoma, making him the first president in OSSM’s history to not hold a doctorate degree (his predecessor Frank Wang held a Ph.D. in mathematics from MIT; founding president Edna Manning held an Ed.D.).

== General ==
Admittance to OSSM is conducted through a highly selective application process, with acceptance rates varying over time. The application process consists of five short essays, submission of high school transcripts and standardized test scores (such as the ACT), recommendations from teachers and counselors, personal questionnaires of the student, a statement from the student's parents, and an on-campus interview.

Students are accepted from all over the state of Oklahoma, and students from each of Oklahoma's 77 counties have been selected to attend. Because students hail from across the state, all are required to live on campus during the week. Classes are held five days a week, with the earliest classes starting at 8 am and the latest ending at 5:30 pm. Some classes, such as astronomy lab and special topics classes, are held at night. Most students have breaks throughout the day depending on their individual, college-style schedule. Students are not allowed in the dorm during their breaks in the academic day, but are to stay academically engaged during these periods. Required physical education classes are held in the afternoon with each student participating in 45 minutes of supervised physical activity twice a week. Fine arts classes (two semesters are required for graduation) are also held in the evenings. One Saturday a month, students are required to take a three-hour test in math, physics, literature, history, or a national standardized test (ACT, SAT, or PSAT). Two weekends a month is called an open weekend, with the students allowed to either go home or stay in the dorms, and the other weekend is an extended weekend with all students required to leave campus.

As part of OSSM's academic program, two hours of study are required each weeknight from 8 to 10 pm, with students on structured study (resulting from unfortunate grades) required to study for an additional hour each night, beginning at 7 pm. Lights out is at 11 pm every night of the week, and internet access is shut off in the dormitories at that time. OSSM fulfills its educational mission at no charge to its students: tuition, books and other class materials, as well as room and board, are all provided by the taxpayers of the State of Oklahoma.

One hundred percent of OSSM graduates are college-bound, and approximately 60% of OSSM graduates choose to remain in-state for college. Of the 1,211 (as of May 2011) graduates since the school's inception, 323 students have been named National Merit Scholars, and an additional 167 students have been selected as National Merit Commended Scholars. Graduates also show exemplary performance in other national scholarship programs, with 227 graduates selected as Robert C. Byrd Scholars, and 124 students nominated for the Presidential Scholars Program, of whom thirteen were named semifinalists and five selected as Presidential Scholars. Graduates excel in statewide scholarship programs, with 553 students receiving Oklahoma State Regents for Higher Education Scholarships and 92 students named Academic All-Staters by the Oklahoma Foundation for Excellence. Twice, in 1998 and again in 2000, the school had the highest ACT composite scores of any high school in the nation. OSSM is also listed as one of the best public high schools in the nation by the Washington Post, in a list of top-performing schools with elite students.

== Controversies ==
Controversies have arisen in the OSSM Residence Hall, where students eat and sleep. Hired in 2021, Residence Hall Superviser Jonathan Triplett allegedly used homophobic slurs in front of students and parents, physically threatened staff, and subjected his partner to “extreme physical abuse” while living with students in the dormitory. Despite these allegations and his guilty plea for DUI in 2023, Triplett was later promoted to Dean of Students with a raise.

In August 2023, under President Cornforth's leadership, OSSM hired as its new Residence Hall Superviser Tanner Feil, an Arkansas-licensed educator who had been formally sanctioned by the Arkansas State Board of Education the year before. According to the Professional Licensure Standards Board, Feil was found to have violated multiple provisions of the state’s educator Code of Ethics, including “exhibit[ing] inappropriate disposition inclusive of professional and ethical behavior,” and "violat[ing] district, state or federal policies or law." In 2025, Feil was promoted to OSSM Dean of Students.

In the same month of August 2023, OSSM also hired former Mount St. Mary principal Talita DeNegri to serve as executive assistant to the President Cornforth; according to reporting in The Oklahoman, DeNegri had recently resigned from her previous high school after an investigation found she had failed to act on credible sexual harassment complaints from students.

=== Sexual misconduct allegations and lawsuit ===
In June 2023, former OSSM employee Keli Pueblo filed a lawsuit alleging sexual harassment, retaliation, and a hostile work environment. In her petition, Pueblo wrote that “there is a closet full of skeletons at OSSM and it remains a dangerous place for women to work and students to live and attend,” and described what she and other female employees characterized as a “toxic and misogynistic” culture. Reporting in The Oklahoman noted that, because OSSM receives no federal funds, the school is not subject to Title IX, contributing to a lack of formal safeguards and an absence of an employee handbook for decades.

The 2023 lawsuit and subsequent investigative reporting uncovered allegations of sexual misconduct against OSSM staff, including the Dean of Admissions, whose personal Venmo account displayed payments labeled “sexual favors”, and the Vice President, who allegedly “had sex with women in his office” and “would routinely shower in his office after visits from these women.”

The same lawsuit and reporting also shed light on decades-long sexual misconduct in OSSM classrooms alleged by former students, including: a biology professor who allegedly had two female students test “the sensitivity of their nipples” in a closet during a lesson and, in another incident, produced a vibrator in class; a math professor who allegedly assigned the sexually explicit “Rice Purity Test” — including questions about French kissing, groping, and oral sex — as a final exam; and a physics professor who allegedly asked female staff about “the size of their breasts,” told stories of oral sex between students on campus, and inappropriately touched students.

The biology and physics professors accused of decades-long sexual misconduct were allowed to retire with benefits in December 2023, under the leadership of President Cornforth; this move was criticized in the press as perpetuating a culture of impunity.

== Academics ==
OSSM's graduation requirements include four semesters of History, four semesters of Literature, two years of the same foreign language (unless this was completed at the student's previous high school), one semester of computer science, four semesters of mathematics including math through Calculus II, three semesters of physics including physics through Electricity and Magnetism, two semesters of chemistry, two semesters of biology, four semesters of physical education, two semesters of fine arts, and two semesters of science, math, or computer science electives. OSSM regularly offers the following classes:

- Biology: Zoology, Botany, Microbiology, Genetics, and Anatomy and Physiology.
- Chemistry: General Chemistry I, General Chemistry II, Organic Chemistry I, Organic Chemistry II, Biochemistry, Physical Chemistry
- Computer Science: Introduction to Computer Science, Object Oriented Programming with Java, Data Structures I, Data Structures II, Computer Architecture, Artificial Intelligence, and Operating Systems
- Foreign Languages: Chinese, French, German, Japanese, Latin, and Spanish.
- Humanities: American Literature, World Literature, American History, East Asian History, Modern Middle East, American Film, Music, and Society, Foreign Policy, and History of Western Traditions I and II
- Physics: General Physics, Mechanics, Electricity and Magnetism, Thermal Waves and Optics, Astronomy, and Quantum Mechanics.
- Mathematics: Pre-Calculus I, Pre-Calculus II, Pre-Calculus III, Calculus I, Calculus II, Multivariate Calculus, Differential Equations, Linear Algebra, Probability and Statistics, Real Analysis, and Complex Analysis.
- Fine Arts: Jazz Band, Beginning Guitar, Intermediate Guitar, Drawing, Mixed Media, Sculpture, Abstract Painting, Fiber Arts, Photography, Ballroom Dance, Studio Dance, and Mosaics.

Additionally, students may arrange to take directed studies with faculty members. Many OSSM students choose to participate in the mentorship program in their senior year, in which they perform research with a mentor (who may be an OSSM faculty member, or an off campus expert).

== Campus ==
OSSM is located on thirty-two acres at the northwest corner of 10th Avenue and Lincoln Boulevard near downtown Oklahoma City, near the University of Oklahoma Health Sciences Center. Its main academic building, Lincoln School, was built in 1903, and used as an elementary school, then torn down and rebuilt in 1948 Oklahoma City Public Schools and used until the 1980s. This building houses a computer lab, the campus auditorium, nineteen classrooms, six labs, a student lounge, a study area, basement, and faculty and administrative offices. The Dan Little Residence Hall, with a capacity of nearly 300 students and twelve faculty families, was completed in 1998, located at the center of campus, complete with a basement containing billiards, game tables, and a TV for students to use during their nightly free time. The basement is also a reinforced storm shelter and is large enough to house the entire school population. The Gymnasium, opened in March 1999, provides a full-size basketball court, a weight room, and a dance floor, among other amenities. The Samson Science and Discovery Center was completed in 2001 and houses three chemistry labs, four physics labs, one computer lab, and one demonstration/lecture room, as well as many personal research labs. In Fall 2003, the Senator Bernice Shedrick Library opened, with a capacity of 50,000 books and 10 computers for student use.

In 2000 the school was scheduled to open remote centers in Enid and Tahlequah.

== Demographics ==
- Student Body: 144
- Average Class Size: 15–18, though many upper-level classes are smaller
- Male-Female Ratio: 1:1

== Notable alumni ==
- Rhiju Das, '95
- Nancy Chen

== See also ==
- Alabama School of Mathematics and Science
- Arkansas School for Mathematics, Sciences, and the Arts
- Carol Martin Gatton Academy of Mathematics and Science in Kentucky
- Craft Academy for Excellence in Science and Mathematics
- Illinois Mathematics and Science Academy
- Indiana Academy for Science, Mathematics, and Humanities
- Kansas Academy of Mathematics and Science
- Louisiana School for Math, Science, and the Arts
- Maine School of Science and Mathematics
- Mississippi School for Mathematics and Science
- North Carolina School of Science and Mathematics
- South Carolina Governor's School for Science and Mathematics
- Texas Academy of Mathematics and Science
