= Alabama School of Mathematics and Science =

Public high school in Mobile, Alabama

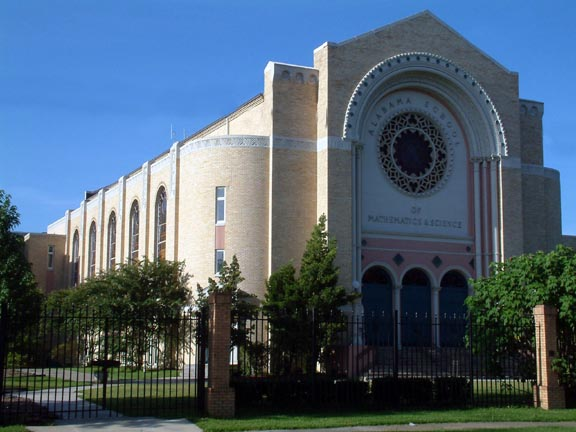
- Central campus building at the Alabama School of Mathematics and Science.

Location
- 1255 Dauphin Street; Mobile, Alabama 36604; United States; 30°41′13″N 88°03′53″W

Information
- School type: Public, Residential Secondary
- Established: 1989 (37 years ago)
- CEEB code: 011793
- President: John Hoyle
- Enrollment: 287 (2025–26)
- Colors: Blue and green
- Nickname: Dragons
- Accreditation: Cognia (Education)
- Website: www.asms.net

The Alabama School of Mathematics and Science (ASMS) is a public residential high school in the Midtown neighborhood of Mobile, Alabama. ASMS is a member of the National Consortium of Secondary STEM Schools (NCSSS). It graduated its first class in 1993.

The school was founded in 1989 as a unique public-private partnership. The Alabama School of Mathematics and Science is part of the state government, while the Alabama School of Mathematics and Science Foundation coordinates private support. It was modeled after the North Carolina School of Science and Mathematics and the Louisiana School for Math, Science, and the Arts where students complete their final two or three years of high school focusing on advanced studies in mathematics and the sciences. Although a boarding school, it does not charge for tuition, books, room, or board. The only fees include an annual student activity fee, which covers class trips and other day-to-day activities, along with an enrollment fee (for new students only), a PSAT fee, and a graduation fee. The annual student activity fee is approximately $1,575. ASMS' focus is preparing its students for higher education, and residency is a requirement for all students.

ASMS's mascot is a green dragon.

== Academics ==
All courses are taught at the Advanced Placement or Honors level. ASMS offers Advanced Placement courses in Biology, Chemistry, Computer Science A, Environmental Science, Physics B, Physics C, Studio Art, English Literature and United States History. More than 40% of ASMS instructors hold terminal degrees, all have earned at least a master's degree, and nearly 100% have taught at the college level. The academic program, which is comprehensive in the sciences as well as the humanities, is complemented by varsity and intramural sports, residential life activities, and college counseling. ASMS is accredited by the Southern Association of Colleges and Schools and is a member of the National Consortium of Secondary STEM Schools, or NCSSS.

Admission is open to all Alabama high school students via a process akin to college admissions. Initially, students could enter only as high school juniors, but in the 1998-1999 school year, the school allowed sophomores to enroll. Beginning in the 2027-2028 school year, the school allowed freshmen to enroll. Students have been admitted as seniors in the past, but this is no longer occurring.

The average composite ACT score for the class of 2024 was a 28.4 and 100% of the graduates matriculated at institutions of higher education

== Summer program ==
ASMS also offers an academic summer camp for students entering the 7th through 9th grades. The Adventures In Math and Science summer program (AIMS) is typically held in June and enrolls roughly 1,000 students over the course of two weeks. Students from across Alabama can enroll in classes that are taught by ASMS instructors. The camp offers a residential program as well as a day-school program. Each AIMS student takes three courses of their choice per week each weekday with a weekend interim period at a local waterpark for students staying more than one week. Admissions to AIMS is highly competitive. More than 50 percent of incoming, full-time students have attended the AIMS summer program. AIMS is made possible by the ASMS Educational Association (ASMSEA). This association decides what camps to host, the costs, and many other details. It has around 15 board members, but anyone can vote for a new program. AIMS courses include: 3D Printing and Design; ACT Prep; All About Animals – Inside and Out; Apps for Smart Devices; Basic Geometry with Computers; CSI: Fun Forensics; Discovering the Alabama Outdoors; Drones and Race cars; Environmental Science; Estuaries: Where Rivers Meet the Sea; Exploring Inner Space; Game Design with Unity 3D; Geology of Minecraft; Invertebrate Zoology; Labs of Doom; Land, Sea, and Air: Basic Navigation, Buoyancy, and Energy of Propulsion; Learning Linux using the Raspberry Pi; Marine Biology; Meteorology; Phun Physics; Python Programming with Raspberry Pi; Robotics; Rocketry; and Studying Nature-Field Biology.

== Facilities ==
ASMS was formerly the site of Mobile Dauphin Way Baptist Church. The church underwent extensive alterations to create classrooms, laboratories, and dormitories. In May 2006, the school commenced groundbreaking on the first new building since the building of the Boy's Dorm. This construction demolished the old Student Activities Center (SAC), and was completed for by the start of the 2007/2008 academic year. The new building, called the Ann Smith Bedsole Building, was named after one of the main founders of the school, former State Senator Ann Bedsole. The Bedsole Building included a new library, reception area, several classrooms and offices, a coffee room, TV/lounge room, and games room.

ASMS is home to four residence halls: Newton, Einstein, Da Vinci, and Curie. Respectively named after Isaac Newton, Albert Einstein, Leonardo da Vinci, and Marie Curie. Boys and girls are evenly divided between the halls. Over the school year, these halls compete with each other in various events to earn hall points. At the end of the year, the hall with the most points is announced as the winning hall and is awarded bragging rights until the next hall is crowned.

In previous years, the girls' dormitory has been spread out over two buildings. Halls one through four are in the girls' dorm building, while humanities, the "fifth hall" is on the fourth floor of the student center (previously the humanities building). Humanities is ASMS' honor hall, which only houses second-year students who have to apply to live there. Girls on the humanities hall partake in competitions alongside a hall of their choosing, which is currently Curie.

The boys' dormitory is in a separate two-story building, with Einstein and Da Vinci sharing the first floor, while Newton and Curie share the second.

Over the summer of 2024, ASMS has built a whole new building, the E. O. Wilson Science Research Center (WSRC). This facility is designed to support STEM learning as well as the ASMS Research Fellows Program. The building was named after Dr. Edward O. Wilson.

Building the WSRC has allowed the former humanities building, the Ben May building, to be renovated into a student center, the Ben May Student Center, named after Ben E. May. The first floor includes a student kitchen, a movie room, a game room, and a lounge area. The second and third floors both have various study/meeting rooms and lounge areas.

ASMS is currently planning and raising funds to open a new residence hall.

== Research Fellows ==
Research Fellows is an innovative educational program where ASMS students are paired with a faculty mentor to work on a college-level research project throughout the school year. The program participants submit their work for competition at regional and state science fairs, regularly taking home top awards. All participants present at the school's Spring Research Forum, where alumni evaluators provide feedback, and some students go on to deliver presentations at national conferences.

== School traditions ==
Events are held by the Student Engagement Team for the entertainment, enrichment, and teambuilding of students. All traditions are beloved by students and have been part of the culture for years or decades. Though some traditions come and go, there are always rituals that permeate the student body and fill the campus with life.

=== Goofy Olympics ===
Goofy Olympics is held in the fall, when a typical high school might hold a homecoming football game. On Spirit Day, classes end earlier in the afternoon. Students dress up in their hall colors and meet up at West Campus to partake in a series of competitions between the residence halls. The selection of competitions changes each year, but always includes a race through an inflatable obstacle course.

=== Geekfest ===
This event includes activities that are predominantly associated with "Geek" culture, such as anime and/or film showings, a LAN party for PCs, independent console games, board games, card games, DDR, Guitar Hero, as well as other events.

=== Mega Musical Chairs ===
This event (usually a fundraiser) is as the name suggests; It is a large game of musical chairs. Students usually compete for prizes and have faculty, staff, and student volunteers (usually members of the SGA) distracting them with water guns and water balloons. The SGA works to secure sponsorships, and the winner of the game gets to choose the charity where the money will be donated.

During the event, faculty members (recently, Derek Barry, history professor) act as referees for the event.

== Student publications ==
- Oculus: features poetry, short stories, and works of art created by the students
- Firewire: the school newspaper
- Azimuth: the school yearbook

== Notable alumni ==
- Virgil Griffith, Creator of WikiScanner; convicted for assisting North Korea in evading international sanctions.
- Ryan Williams, Professor of Computer Science at the Massachusetts Institute of Technology

== See also ==
- Arkansas School for Mathematics, Sciences, and the Arts
- Carol Martin Gatton Academy of Mathematics and Science in Kentucky
- Craft Academy for Excellence in Science and Mathematics
- Illinois Mathematics and Science Academy
- Indiana Academy for Science, Mathematics, and Humanities
- Kansas Academy of Mathematics and Science
- Louisiana School for Math, Science, and the Arts
- Maine School of Science and Mathematics
- Mississippi School for Mathematics and Science
- North Carolina School of Science and Mathematics
- Oklahoma School of Science and Mathematics
- South Carolina Governor's School for Science and Mathematics
- Texas Academy of Mathematics and Science
