= Louisiana School for Math, Science, and the Arts =

Public school in Louisiana, United States

Location
- 715 University Parkway; Natchitoches, Louisiana 71457; United States; 31.7526°N 93.0959°W

Information
- Type: Public, Selective Magnet, Residential
- Motto: Latin: Praecellemus (We shall excel)
- Opened: 1983
- Founder: Jimmy D. Long, Donald G. Kelly, Robert A. Alost, Dave Treen
- Sister school: Arkansas School of Mathematics, Sciences, and the Arts and The Mississippi School for Mathematics and Sciences (Fellow SLAMT Participants)
- Oversight: Board of Elementary and Secondary Education; LSMSA Board of Directors
- Authorizer: State of Louisiana, Division of Administration
- Executive Director: Jason Anderson
- Staff: 115
- Faculty: 57
- Grades: 10-12
- Gender: Coed
- Average class size: 15 (maximum mandated by state statute)
- Student to teacher ratio: 17:1
- Colors: Blue and gold
- Slogan: Above. Beyond.
- Mascot: Ace the Eagle
- Nickname: Louisiana School
- Team name: Eagles
- Accreditation: Southern Association of Colleges and Schools
- Newspaper: The Renaissance
- Yearbook: The Rubicon
- School fees: About $1500 in boarding and facility fees (2013)
- Affiliations: NCSSSMST, Blue Ribbon Schools Program
- Literary Publication: Folio
- Website: www.lsmsa.edu

The Louisiana School for Math, Science, and the Arts (LSMSA) is a public residential high school located in Natchitoches, Louisiana, US on the campus of Northwestern State University (NSU). It is a member of the National Consortium for Specialized Secondary Schools of Mathematics, Science and Technology (NCSSSMST). In 2016, Niche ranked LSMSA the 9th best public high school nationwide.

== Background ==
LSMSA is the brainchild of State Representative Jimmy D. Long of Natchitoches, Robert A. Alost, then Dean of the College of Education at Northwestern State University; Democratic State Senator Donald G. Kelly of Natchitoches; and Governor David C. Treen, which is where the Treen auditorium gets its name. The school was conceived to offer a unique experience to the state's brightest students while supplying Natchitoches with an influx of commerce and attention. On the heels of a fleeting surplus of state funds from oil revenues following America's oil crises of the late seventies, Gov. Treen approved the funding for the school. Classes were originally held on the ground floor of Prudhomme Hall, an unused dormitory on the campus of NSU while female students lived in the upper floor and male students originally lived in Bossier Hall, another dorm. Renovation of the "High School Building," (known by no other formal title, but formerly the campus of Natchitoches High School) was completed in 1984, and the ceremonial ribbon was cut by then Louisiana Governor Edwin Edwards.

The Louisiana School was the second state-supported residential school of its kind — the first being the North Carolina School of Science and Mathematics, which opened in 1980. The school was founded in the early 1980s with the first class enrolling as juniors in the fall of 1983, graduating in 1985.

Academically, the school is similar to the North Carolina School of Science and Mathematics (NCSSM). Studies focus on mathematics, science, and the humanities. Like NCSSM math and science high schools, it has an arts program, with instruction in music, theater, visual art, and dance. Daily class schedules are conducted similar to college schedules (instead of the traditional class periods in most other high schools). Much of the classes are also taught with college textbooks.

Among the various ensembles in both voice and instrumental, student musicians get the opportunity to perform music special to Louisiana through the Louisiana Composers' Consortium founded by LSMSA's own Dr. Al Benner.

The school's College Admission Profile summarizes the school: "Graduating its first class in 1985, the Louisiana School for Math, Science, and the Arts is a state-supported, residential program, enrolling high achieving and talented students throughout Louisiana in grades ten through twelve. Most students begin as sophomores or juniors and are selected from a pool of applicants representing at least 65% of the state's public school districts, as well as private schools. The student body, therefore, represents the ethnic, cultural, and socioeconomic diversity of Louisiana residents. LSMSA is considered as a "Special School" by the Louisiana Board of Elementary and Secondary Education."

In 2017, state Senator Francis C. Thompson of Delhi introduced legislation to name the Louisiana School for Math, Science and the Arts in honor of Jimmy D. Long, who as the chairman for sixteen years of the House Education Committee, was among those instrumental in the establishment of the institution. After strong support in the state Senate, the renaming legislation passed the House Education Committee despite heated opposition from alumni who object in part to the school having such a lengthy name.

== Admissions ==
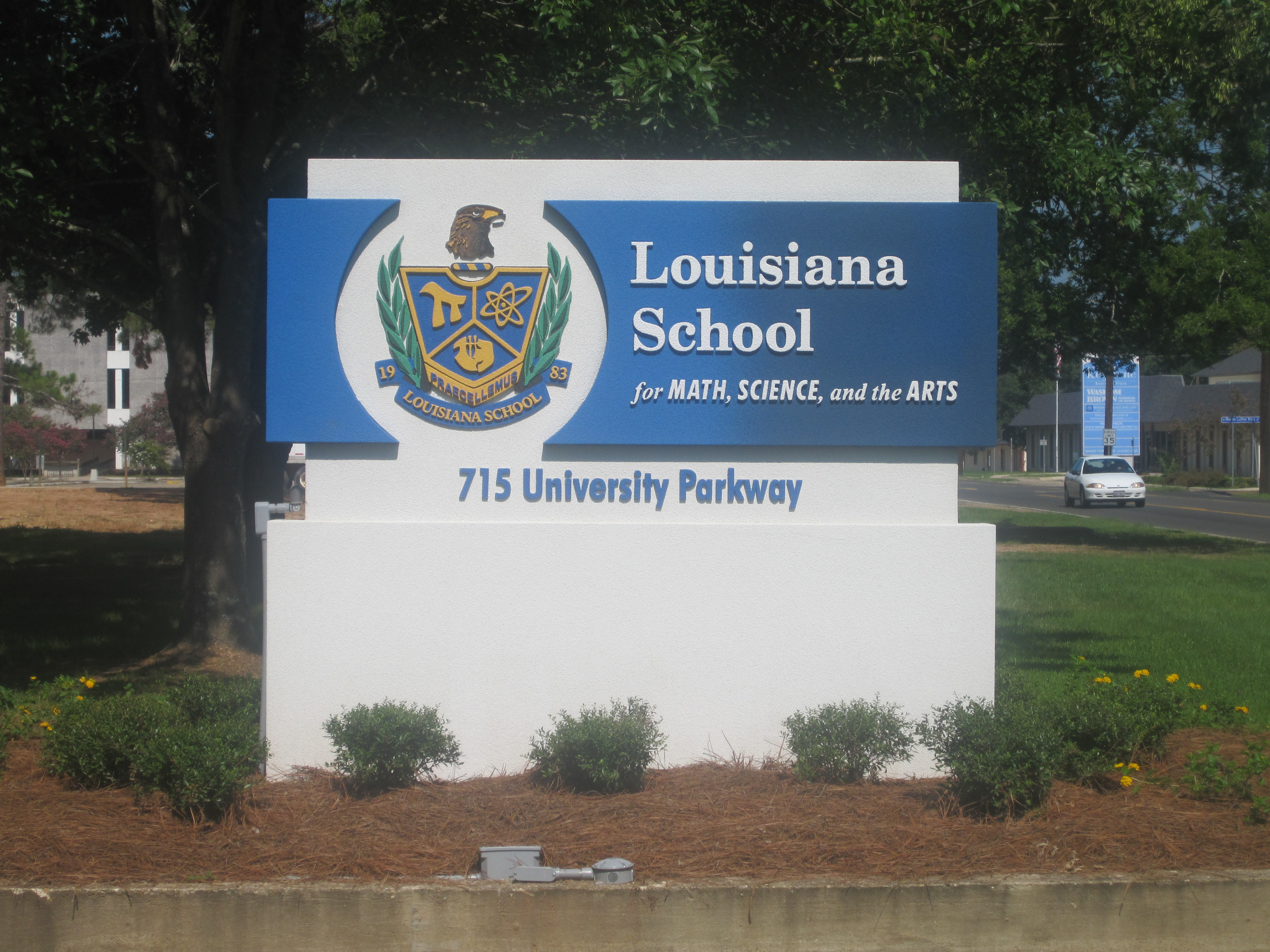
Louisiana School for Math, Science, and the Arts sign

As LSMSA recruits students from all of Louisiana, it can be described as a statewide magnet school. Prospective students apply during the fall of their freshman, sophomore or junior year. Applicants submit application forms, grade transcripts, SAT or ACT results, and four letters of recommendation with one optional recommendation form. Applicants to the arts curriculum also submit a portfolio of artwork or audition. As of the 2007–2008 school year, LSMSA added its first sophomore class, which composed of 40 students. 65 students have been invited to be in the 2008–2009 Sophomore class.

== Residential life ==
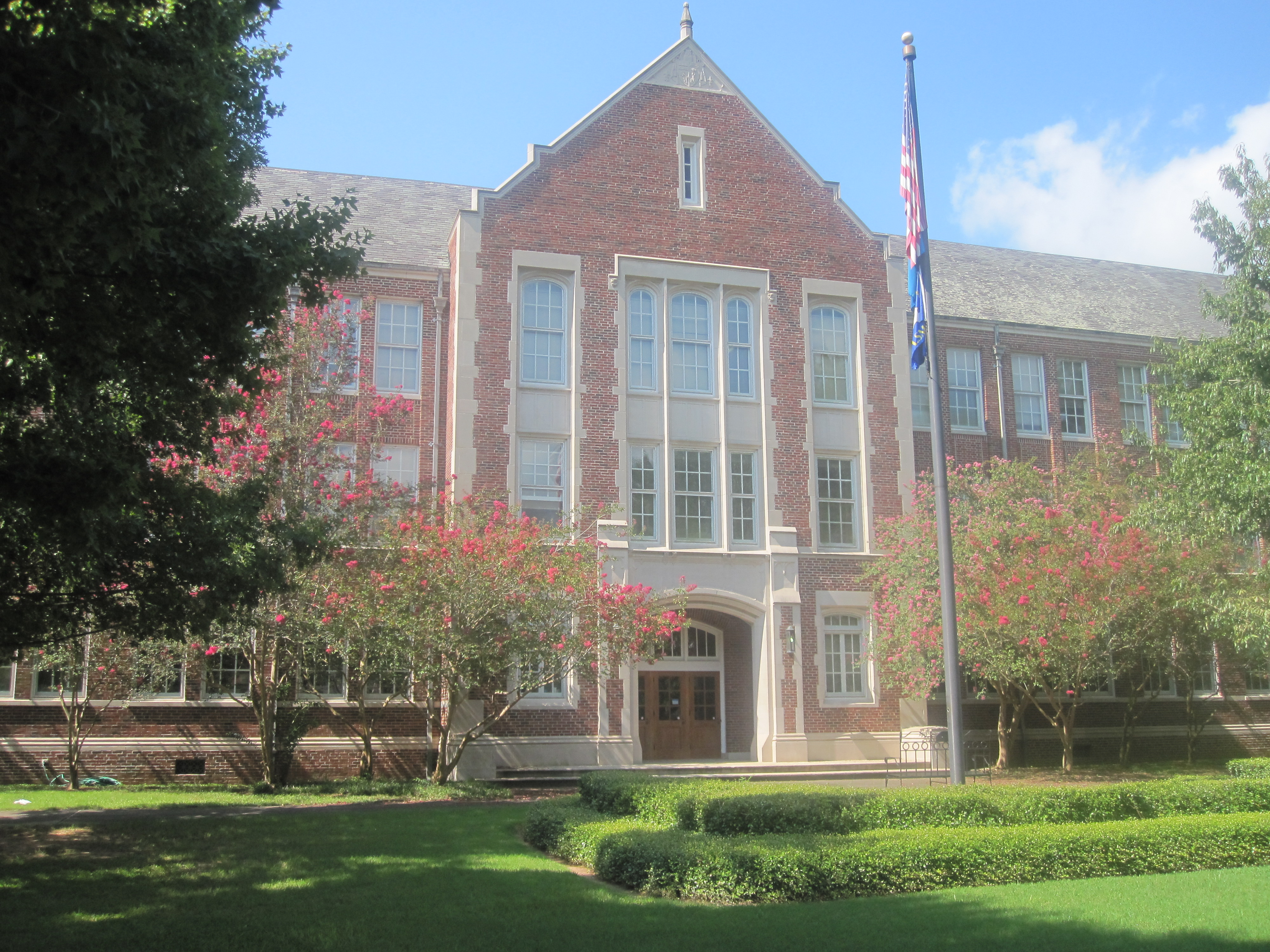
The Louisiana School for Math, Science, and the Arts is located on the campus of Northwestern State University in Natchitoches, Louisiana.

Students who attend LSMSA live in dormitories, away from their families, much like university students. For most of the school's history, students lived in Caddo Hall (girls) or Prudhomme Hall (boys), both long-term loans from Northwestern State University. On March 13, 2019, LSMSA hosted a groundbreaking ceremony for a residence hall of their own. The four-story, 110,000 sf Living Learning Commons was designed by the joint-venture architectural team of Ashe Broussard Weinzettle and Tipton Associates. In August 2021, students returned to campus for the school year and became the first classes to occupy the Living Learning Commons. The $25 million facility, funded by the State of Louisiana, houses 360 students across 3 towers and 10 independent "neighborhoods." Amenities include a student lounge, covered porch, craft room, study rooms, a grand lobby, a health clinic, a demonstration kitchen and dining area, and an outdoor firepit. The Hall Commons in each neighborhood is suited for sharing a meal or socializing, while the glassed-in study lounges maintain quiet for focus. Each neighborhood also features laundry facilities, with costs included in the student fee, as well as an office and apartment for the Student Life Advisor.

Students have free time during weekdays during which they can sign out to various areas within the city of Natchitoches. The Louisiana School provides a shuttle for transportation because students can only use their cars to drive home on weekends, unless they have high grades and a good disciplinary record, in which case they may use their cars for a specified time period. As LSMSA is located on a university campus, much of the residential life of LSMSA students resembles that of their university counterparts. Whereas a university has relatively little liability to bear when dealing with 18+ year old adults, LSMSA must contend with a student body mainly of minors. The school tries to enforce rigorous discipline under terms of "in loco parentis," meaning in the place of a parent.

== Awards/Rankings ==
- Niche’s #1 Best Public High School Teachers in America (2026)
- Niche’s #26 Best Public Magnet High Schools in America (2026)
- Niche’s #1 Best Public High School in Louisiana (2026)
- Niche’s #1 Best Public High School for Stem (2026)
- Niche’s #1 Best Public Magnet High Schools in Louisiana (2026)
- Niche’s #4 Best College Prep High Schools in Louisiana (2026)

== Notable alumni ==
- Hong Chau, actress
- Rod Dreher (1985) - The Dallas Morning News editorial writer, columnist, frequent contributor to National Review, The New York Post
- Carla Speed McNeil (1986) - Comics writer and artist, most notably of Finder
- Trent Dawson (1989) - actor, played Henry Coleman on As the World Turns.
- Joel Michael Guy Jr. (2006) - Convicted murderer.
- Michael Hochberg (1998) - award-winning professor of nanophotonics at the University of Washington
- Angie Drobnic Holan (1990) - editor for PolitiFact and was part of the Pulitzer Prize winning team of journalists noted for their fact-checking of the 2008 presidential elections in the United States.
- Mark Johnson (2002) - North Carolina Superintendent of Public Instruction
- Josh Tickell (1993) - Biodiesel pioneer and director of FUEL, which won the 2008 Sundance Film Festival Audience Award for Best Documentary.
- Slater Rhea (2005) - Singer and TV personality in China.
- Jeffery Roberson, aka Varla Jean Merman (1987) - American actor, singer, and drag performer.
- Carol S. Woodward - mathematician
- Lenny J. Richoux (1985) - Retired Major General of the USAF
- Stacey Hawkins (1987) - Retired Lieutenant General of the USAF

== Notable faculty ==
- William Rodney Allen - noted expert on Walker Percy and Kurt Vonnegut

== See also ==
- Alabama School of Mathematics and Science
- Arkansas School for Mathematics, Sciences, and the Arts
- Carol Martin Gatton Academy of Mathematics and Science in Kentucky
- Craft Academy for Excellence in Science and Mathematics
- Illinois Mathematics and Science Academy
- Indiana Academy for Science, Mathematics, and Humanities
- Kansas Academy of Mathematics and Science
- Maine School of Science and Mathematics
- Mississippi School for Mathematics and Science
- North Carolina School of Science and Mathematics
- Oklahoma School of Science and Mathematics
- South Carolina Governor's School for Science and Mathematics
- Texas Academy of Mathematics and Science
