= North Carolina School of Science and Mathematics =

Location
- 1219 Broad Street; Durham, North Carolina 27705; United States

Information
- Type: Public boarding school
- Motto: Maius Opus Moveo (Accept the Greater Challenge)
- Established: 1980 (46 years ago)
- Parent institution: UNC System
- CEEB code: 341077
- Chancellor: Todd Roberts
- Grades: 11–12
- Enrollment: Durham Campus: 680 Morganton Campus: 300
- Campus type: Suburban
- Colors: Blue and grey
- Athletics conference: NCHSAA, Diamond Nine 3A (Durham); NCHSAA, Catawba River 1A (Morganton)
- Mascot: Unicorns (Durham); Dragons (Morganton)
- Nickname: Unis, Narwhals (swim)
- Accreditation: AdvancED
- Newspaper: The Stentorian
- Tuition: Free
- Communities served: State of North Carolina
- Affiliations: NCSSS; University of North Carolina
- Website: www.ncssm.edu

The North Carolina School of Science and Mathematics (NCSSM) is a two-year, public residential high school with two physical campuses located in Durham, North Carolina, and Morganton, North Carolina, that focuses on the intensive study of science, mathematics and technology. It accepts rising juniors from across North Carolina and enrolls them through senior year. Although NCSSM is a public school, enrollment is extremely selective, and applicants undergo a competitive review process for admission. NCSSM is a founding member of the National Consortium of Secondary STEM Schools (NCSSS) and a constituent institution of the University of North Carolina system.

== History ==
=== Durham Campus ===
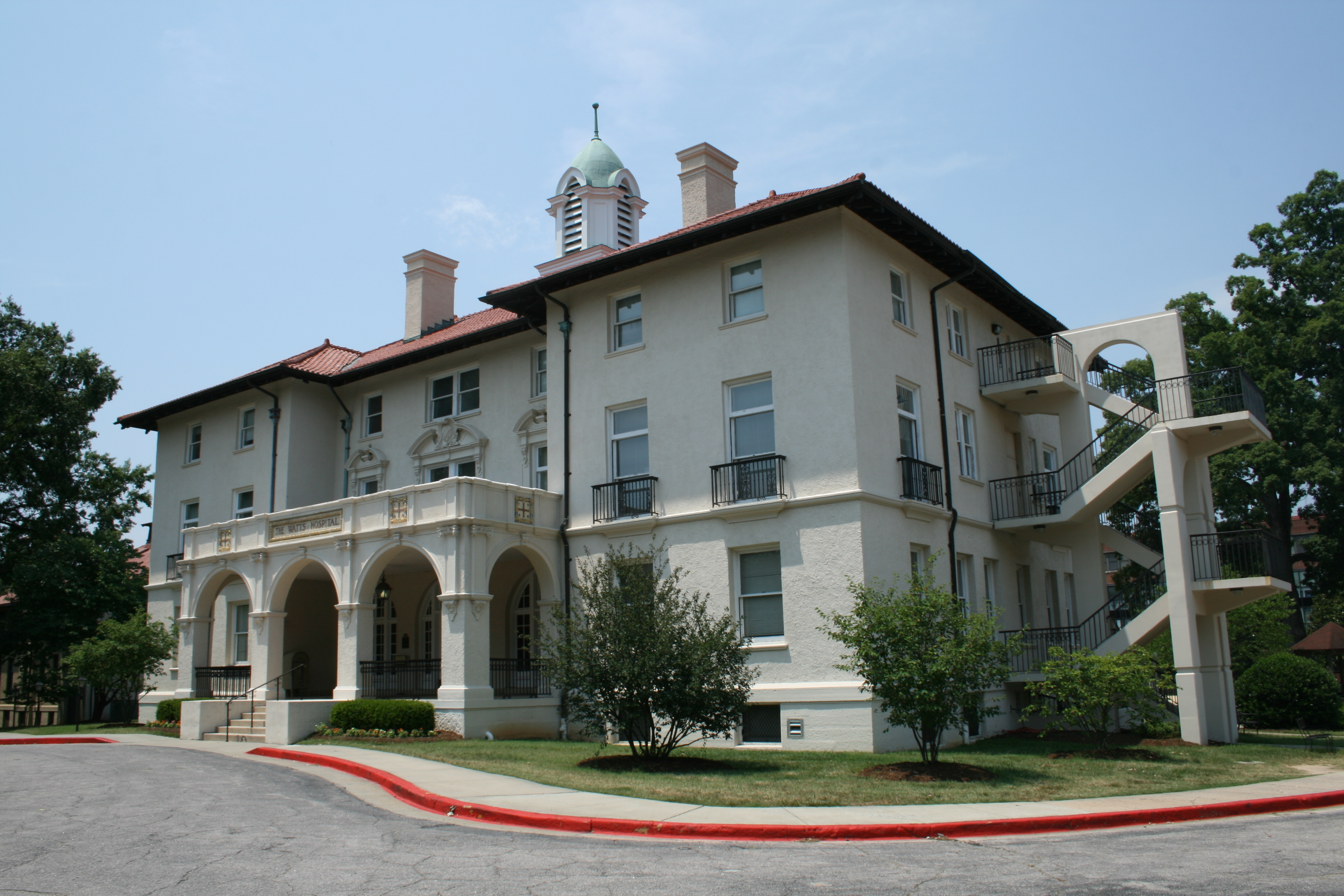
Watts building on Durham campus, which houses humanities classrooms and offices, business offices, and the math department

Before its life as NCSSM, the Durham campus was initially Watts Hospital, which operated from 1895 until 1976. After sitting abandoned for four years, the campus reopened as NCSSM, welcoming its first class of students in September 1980.

Since its inception in 1980, NCSSM has been fully funded by the state, allowing students to attend without paying any tuition, room, board, or other student fees. This funding is supplemented by the NCSSM Foundation's private funding, which supports NCSSM's academic, residential, and outreach programs as well as providing funds for some capital improvements. The Foundation has raised over $25 million in private support from corporations, foundations, alumni, parents and friends of NCSSM. A tuition fee was considered for the 2002–03 school year in the midst of a state budgetary crisis, but it was never implemented. In 2003, the North Carolina General Assembly (NCGA) approved a bill granting tuition costs for any university in the University of North Carolina system to all graduates of NCSSM, starting with the class of 2004, as an incentive to encourage NCSSM's talented students to stay in North Carolina. That bill was amended in 2005 to allow students to use additional tuition monies awarded to cover "costs of attendance." However, the tuition waiver was phased out in the Appropriations Act of 2009 in the North Carolina Senate in order to balance the budget. The bill states that "No new recipients shall be funded after June 30, 2009." The tuition grant was renewed retroactive for 2021 graduates in November 2021 in the Current Appropriations Act of 2021. NCSSM was integrated into the University of North Carolina system in 2007 as the system's 17th institution.

NCSSM served as a model for 18 similar schools, many of which are now members of the National Consortium of Secondary STEM Schools (NCSSS).

=== Morganton Campus ===
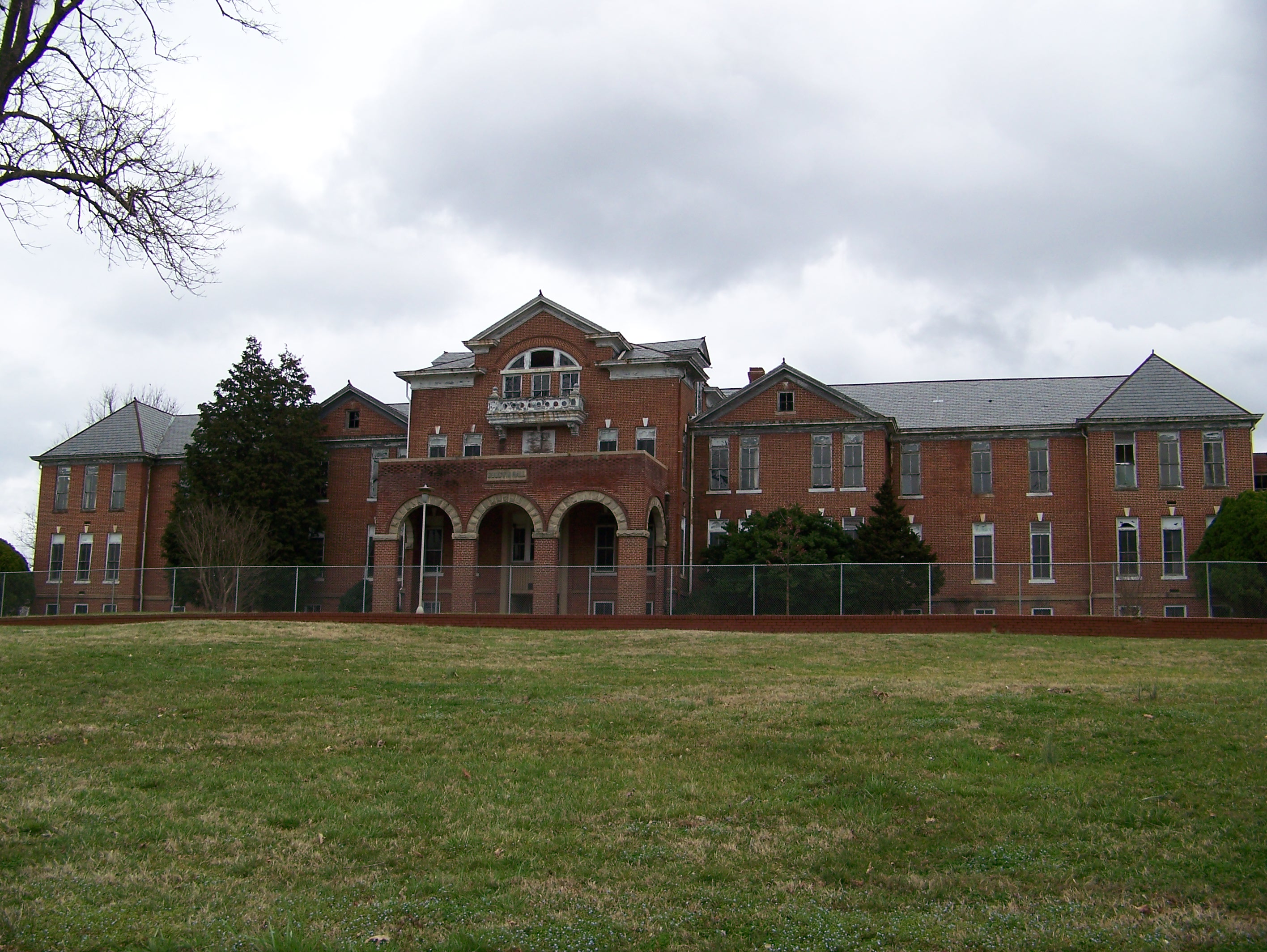
Goodwin Hall located on Morganton campus, which was previously used by the North Carolina School for the Deaf.

In 2006, the NCGA began planning to expand the Durham campus to allow for greater enrollment and new curriculum opportunities. In 2013, the plan was expanded to look at other locations, and a study concluded that Morganton would be the new campus. The new campus was created from property at the North Carolina School for the Deaf (NCSD) in Morganton, North Carolina, where the student population had been declining and no longer needed the excess land and 4 buildings, which were transferred to NCSSM in September 2017. Renovation of the buildings and construction of two new buildings began on June 21, 2019. The Morganton campus opened for the 2022–23 school year, welcoming the first class of residential students on August 10, 2022, and houses approximately 300 students. It graduated its first class in May 2024.

== Academics ==
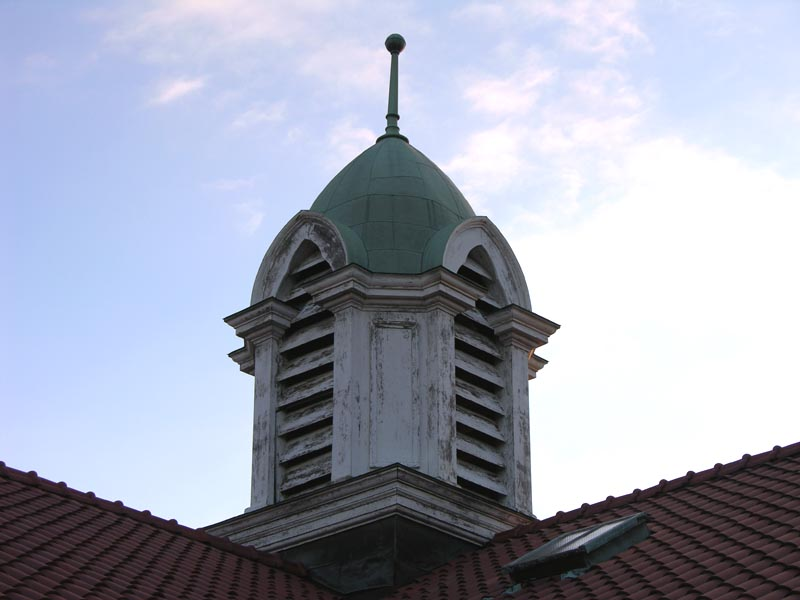
Cupola atop the 1908 Watts building, used in the school's logo until 2015

NCSSM students are not given a class rank and are encouraged to strive for their best rather than competing against other students. Although students previously were not given grade point averages (GPAs), the school has since changed their ways to provide GPAs on transcripts and simplify the college application process.

The school has done well in the national rankings for many years, including being listed as the 4th best public high school in the United States and the second best in North Carolina by Newsweek and being listed among The Washington Post's 2014 "top-performing schools with elite students.". In 2022, Niche deemed NCSSM the best public high school in the United States. Teachers at NCSSM have also won awards, with music instructor Phillip Riggs winning the Grammy Music Educator Award in 2016.

=== Demographics ===
During the 2013–2014 school year, NCSSM housed approximately 680 students. There were 346 seniors enrolled in the class of 2013. Currently, there are more females than males due to the larger number of female dormitory spaces. Approximately 56% of students are Caucasian, 26.6% are Asian American, 8.1% are African American, 5.5% are Hispanic, and 0.3% are Native American. The student population of NCSSM is designed to be a demographic reflection of the population of North Carolina as a whole; additionally, a certain number of slots are reserved for each congressional district.

== Academic achievement ==
In 2018 the average SAT score was 1439 of 1600, the second highest in North Carolina. In 2019 it was also second highest in North Carolina, with 1437 of 1600.

== External programs ==
NCSSM also offers a variety of external programs focused on educating teachers and students outside of the school across North Carolina. The school offers workshops for strengthening K–12 math and science education, focusing on "teaching the teacher." These workshops focus particularly in science and mathematics education.

== Extracurricular activities ==
NCSSM has a large variety of clubs and varsity sports, ranging from arts, academic, and ethnic culture clubs to intramural and varsity athletic programs. Students at NCSSM regularly excel in club competitions, academic events, and sports.

=== Awards and recognition ===
The school is known to place upwards of ten students a year in the Siemens Competition in Math, Science, and Technology. In 2006, Nicholas Tang and Sagar Indurkhya became national finalists in that year's Siemens Competition. NCSSM also regularly produces semifinalists in the Regeneron Science Talent Search (STS) and Intel Science and Engineering Fair.

- In 2008, the NCSSM team won first place in the WorldQuest geography competition at the national level.
- In 2010, NCSSM won first place at the 2010 National DOE Science Bowl Competition, and the students on the team met Michelle Obama.
- In 2015, the NCSSM Robotics Team, FIRST Robotics Team 900, The Zebracorns, came in 3rd place at the FIRST World Championship in Saint Louis.
- In 2019, 6 students were selected as members of the 300 Regeneron STS scholars. Navami Jain was selected as one of the 40 finalists in the Regeneron Science Talent Search (STS)
- In 2023, 10 students were selected as Regeneron STS top 300 scholars. Amongst these, 4 students, Kamisi Adetunji, Angela Chen, Linden James, and Oziomachukwu Chidubem Obi were selected as STS finalists.
- In 2024, 10 students were selected as Regeneron STS top 300 scholars.
- In 2025, 8 students were selected as Regeneron STS top 300 scholars. Durham student Ava Grace Cummings' research won 2nd place in the 2025 STS.

=== Athletics ===
The North Carolina School of Science and Mathematics in Durham offers 21 varsity sports to its students, including baseball, volleyball, basketball, and wrestling. The Morganton campus offers 15 varsity sports, including basketball, golf, and cross country.

In 2011, for the first time in this school's history, all of the NCSSM varsity sports in the fall season won regional championships. Men's cross-country and men's soccer were state champions, while women's tennis and women's volleyball were state runners-up and a member of the women's diving team placed second at the 1A/2A state meet. The NCSSM men's cross-country team has won three straight state championships.

In the 2018–2019 season, NCSSM teams received nine Mid-State 2A conference titles. The school's athletes were awarded 98 All-Conference titles in the 2018–2019 season, at least one in every sport offered by the school.

=== Robotics ===
NCSSM has a FIRST Robotics Competition team, Team 900, The Zebracorns. Awards won by this team include

- 2014 North Carolina Regional Winners
- 2015 North Carolina Regional Winners
- 2015 FIRST Championship Curie Division Winners
- 2017 North Carolina District – Raleigh Event District Chairman's Award
- 2017 FIRST North Carolina State Championship Winners
- 2018 North Carolina District – Forsyth County Event District Chairman's Award
- 2024 Orange County Event District Impact Award
- 2025 FIRST North Carolina State Championship Winners

They also presented at ROSCon 2018 in Madrid, Spain.

NCSSM First Technology Challenge

- Binding Energy World Championship Participant in Houston, TX 2023
- FTC 22377 SigmaCorns North Carolina State 3rd INSPIRE 2024

NCSSM Morganton has had a Vex Robotics team. Awards won by this team include

- 2023 Tournament Champions (56727B)

== Notable alumni ==
- Adam Falk 1983, President of Williams College
- Helen Moore 1984, mathematician
- Maya Ajmera 1985, Founder and President of The Global Fund for Children
- Harmeet Dhillon 1985, attorney currently serving as US Assistant Attorney General for the Civil Rights Division
- Erica D. Smith 1988, member of the North Carolina Senate
- Daniel P. Aldrich 1992, academic in the fields of political science, public policy, and Asian studies
- Matt Welsh 1992, former Gordon McKay Professor of Computer Science at Harvard University and author of several books
- Ralph Hise 1994, member of North Carolina Senate
- Steven Schkolne 1994, computer scientist and inventor of speedcabling
- Rhiannon Giddens 1995, member of the Grammy-winning Carolina Chocolate Drops
- Scott Jacobson 1995, comedy writer (Bob's Burgers) and four-time Emmy winner
- Christina Hammock Koch 1997, NASA astronaut and Flight Engineer on ISS Expeditions 59, 60, and 61 and Mission Specialist on the 2026 Artemis II Moon mission where she took the photograph Earthset
- Chris Sembroski 1997, Private astronaut on the Inspiration4 mission
- B. Scott 1999, Internet celebrity, TV personality and blogger
- Chris Hardwick 2002, competitive speedcuber
- Vann R. Newkirk II 2006, Journalist, staff writer at The Atlantic and health policy analyst
- Janneke Parrish 2009, Labor activist and #AppleToo leader
- Lamar Richardson 2011, Tony award winning producer

== See also ==
- Alabama School of Mathematics and Science
- Arkansas School for Mathematics, Sciences, and the Arts
- Carol Martin Gatton Academy of Mathematics and Science in Kentucky
- Craft Academy for Excellence in Science and Mathematics
- Illinois Mathematics and Science Academy
- Indiana Academy for Science, Mathematics, and Humanities
- Kansas Academy of Mathematics and Science
- Louisiana School for Math, Science, and the Arts
- Maine School of Science and Mathematics
- Mississippi School for Mathematics and Science
- Oklahoma School of Science and Mathematics
- South Carolina Governor's School for Science and Mathematics
- Texas Academy of Mathematics and Science
