= Julia Roberts (disambiguation) =

Julia Roberts (born 1967) is an American actress.

Julia Roberts may also refer to:

- Julia Roberts (soccer) (born 1991), American professional soccer midfielder
- Julia Roberts (television presenter) (born 1956), British television home shopping host
- Julia Link Roberts, American educator

== See also ==
- Julie Roberts (born 1979), American country music singer
- Juliet Roberts (born 1962), British jazz, rock soul and house music singer songwriter
