= Helen Moore (mathematician) =

American mathematician

Helen Elizabeth Moore is an American mathematician. Originally a differential geometer, she moved from academia to industry and from pure to applied mathematics, and in particular the applications of control theory to combination therapy in the health industry. She is affiliated with pharmaceutical company AstraZeneca.

== Education and career ==
Moore grew up in Charlotte, North Carolina, where her interest in mathematics came from her grandfather, an architect. In her last two years of high school, she attended a state magnet school, the North Carolina School of Science and Mathematics. Next, she attended the University of North Carolina at Chapel Hill, initially studying physics but shifting to mathematics, and starting an ongoing mathematics competition club at the university. She completed her Ph.D. at Stony Brook University with a doctorate in differential geometry and minimal surface theory, Minimal Submanifolds with Various Curvature Bounds, supervised by Michael T. Anderson. She was frequently the only woman in her undergraduate classes, and the only woman of ten in her graduate program when she entered to leave with a Ph.D.

After completing her doctorate, Moore taught at Bowdoin College and, on a sabbatical from Bowdoin, at Stanford University. While at Stanford, she became interested in disease modeling. She became Associate Director of the American Institute of Mathematics, while continuing to work as a mentor to women in science, technology, engineering, and mathematics at Stanford. From there she moved to industry, working for Bristol-Myers Squibb and later AstraZeneca. Moore was elected to the council of the Society for Industrial and Applied Mathematics in 2016. Furthermore, as of 2023 Moore serves as the Vice-Chair for the SIAM's Activity Group on Life Sciences.

In 2021, Moore returned to academia as an associate professor in the Laboratory for Systems Medicine within the College of Medicine at the University of Florida, where her research focuses on modeling disease-immune dynamics, assessing systems model predictions, and optimizing combination drug regimens.

== Recognition ==
In 2018, the Society for Industrial and Applied Mathematics listed Moore as a Fellow, "for impactful industrial application of mathematical modeling in oncology, immunology, and virology. For mentoring, teaching, and leadership."

In 2025, WUFT highlighted Moore's personal journey in an article titled "When math meets medicine: How a mathematician turned grief into a mission," detailing how she transformed personal loss into a mission to improve cancer treatment through mathematical modeling.
