= Joe Craft Center =

University of Kentucky basketball practice facility

Coordinates: 38.039863°N 84.500088°W

The Joe Craft Center, opened in January 2007, is a basketball practice facility and athletics office building attached to Memorial Coliseum on the "Avenue of Champions" at the University of Kentucky in Lexington, Kentucky.

The facility is named after businessman and philanthropist Joe Craft, a Hazard, Kentucky native, who pledged $6 million towards the completion of the $30 million project.

== Features ==
The 102,000 ft^{2} (9,480 m^{2}) structure contains separate practice courts for the men's and women's basketball programs, as well as support spaces for both programs, including coaches' offices. It also includes a ticket office, athletic administration offices, and the renovation of 17,500 ft^{2} (1,630 m^{2}) of space in Memorial Coliseum to support requirements from the volleyball, gymnastics, and other sports teams. The Joe Craft Center features several state-of-the-art video rooms for game film viewing, separate men's and women's locker rooms, and new coaches' offices.

== History ==
Construction began in August 2005 on the north side of the Coliseum. The $30 million structure was completed on January 11, 2007. As a result, Memorial Coliseum has more ample space for volleyball and gymnastics practice and games.

== See also ==
- Buildings at the University of Kentucky
- Cityscape of Lexington, Kentucky
