= Nancy Chen =

American network television journalist

- Born: Nancy Chen; 1988 (age 37–38); Texas
- Education: University of Southern California (BA)
- Occupations: News anchor and television journalist
- Years active: 2010–present
- Employer: CBS News

Nancy Chen (born 1988) is an American television journalist and correspondent with CBS News in New York.

== Early life ==
Nancy Chen was born in Texas and raised in Tulsa, Oklahoma. She attended Oklahoma School of Science and Mathematics, studied Chinese at Peking University in Beijing, and graduated as a Trustee Scholar from the University of Southern California in Los Angeles with a degree in international relations.

== Career ==
=== Early career ===
Chen began her career as a print reporter writing for the Tulsa World for three years. During college, she worked as a web producer at KABC-TV in Los Angeles and was involved in production for NBC Sports in Beijing during the 2008 Summer Olympics.

She began her broadcast journalist career at KSBY in San Luis Obispo, California as a multimedia journalist. She subsequently worked for WHDH-TV in Boston, Massachusetts where she covered the 2014 Winter Olympics in Sochi, the 2015 Super Bowl, the 2016 Summer Olympics in Rio de Janeiro, the 2013 EF5 tornado in Moore, Oklahoma, and the Boston Marathon bombing. Chen then joined WJLA-TV in Washington, D.C. in 2017 as a weekday evening anchor. She hosted a reoccurring franchise titled "Hero 24/7" that highlighted volunteers in the Washington, D.C. community. She won two Emmy Awards from the National Capital division of the National Academy of Television Arts and Sciences during her time at WJLA-TV, one of which was for coverage of the 2017 Congressional baseball shooting.

=== Current ===
In 2021, Chen joined CBS News as a New York-based correspondent after working as a correspondent with the organization's Newspath division since February of 2020. She has covered national stories including the criminal trial of Kyle Rittenhouse, the Waukesha Christmas parade attack, the 2022 Bronx apartment fire, the Omicron wave in New York City, and the 2022 Buffalo shooting.

In 2022, CBS This Morning won an Emmy Award at the 43rd News and Documentary Emmy Awards for "Outstanding Live News Program" where Chen was listed as a correspondent. She got laid off on Oct 30, 2025 with seven other on-air personalities, all of whom are women. Four among the eight are persons of color.
