= Edna Manning =

First president of Oklahoma School of Science and Mathematics

Edna McDuffie Manning (born 1942) was the first president of the Oklahoma School of Science and Mathematics. She also owns a ranch on which she raises limousin cattle. In 2007 she was inducted into the Oklahoma Educators Hall of Fame.

== Education and career ==
In February 1986, Manning became superintendent of the school district in Shawnee, Oklahoma. Facing a $1.2 million deficit, she reorganized the district's elementary schools, converting the small neighborhood schools into grade centers, each housing a single grade. This reorganization aroused strong feelings among some of the parents in the district, and resulted in several threats.

In 1988 Manning was appointed president of the Oklahoma School of Science and Mathematics, opened to students in 1990. Manning aided in the building and development of the institution, supervising the selection of faculty and the development of the curriculum.

In 2006, the OSSM board of trustees voted to rename the OSSM classroom building, previously called the Lincoln School, the Manning Academic Center. In September 2007, Manning was inducted into the Oklahoma Educators Hall of Fame.

Manning retired from her position as president of OSSM in June 2012, and was succeeded by Dr. Frank Y.H. Wang. After Wang announced his own retirement, Manning returned to OSSM to serve as interim president for the 2022-2023 school year, until the succession of Tony Cornforth, OSSM's third president, to the role in June 2023.
