= Stephanie Pace Marshall =

American educator

Stephanie Pace Marshall FRSA
- Born: Stephanie Anne Pace; July 19, 1945 (age 81); The Bronx, New York, US
- Children: 2
- Awards: Order of Lincoln Award (2005)

Academic background
- Education: Queens College, City University of New York (BA); University of Chicago (MA); Loyola University Chicago (PhD)
- Thesis: An analysis of the profile, roles, functions, and behavior of women on boards of education in DuPage County, Illinois (1983)
- Doctoral advisor: Melvin P. Heller

Academic work
- Discipline: Education
- Website: stephaniepacemarshall.com

Stephanie Anne Pace Marshall FRSA (born July 19, 1945), is an American educator and the founding president of the Illinois Mathematics and Science Academy.

== Education ==
Stephanie Anne Pace was born to Dominick Martin and Anne (née Price) Pace in the Bronx, New York on July 19, 1945, and grew up in the New York City area. She graduated from East Meadow High School in 1963. Pace attended Muhlenberg College from 1963 to 1965 before transferring to Queens College, City University of New York where she completed a B.A. in education and sociology in 1967. In 1971, she earned an M.A. in curriculum philosophy from the University of Chicago. In January 1983, she completed a Ph.D. in Educational Administration and Industrial Relations from Loyola University Chicago. Her dissertation was titled, An analysis of the profile, roles, functions, and behavior of women on boards of education in DuPage County, Illinois. Marshall's doctoral advisor was Melvin P. Heller.

== Career ==
Marshall was a schoolteacher in elementary and junior high schools in Alsip, Illinois. She taught graduate courses at the National Louis University. In 1976, Marshall became assistant superintended for instruction for Batavia Public School District 101. From 1983 to 1985, She served as Batavia's superintendent.

Marshall served as president of the Illinois Mathematics and Science Academy from its 1985 founding until 2007. She was president of the Association for Supervision and Curriculum Development (ASCD).

Her philosophy of education was influenced by anthropologist Margaret Mead and educators Ernie Boyer and Elliot Eisner.

== Awards and honors ==
Marshall was inducted as a laureate of The Lincoln Academy of Illinois and received the Order of Lincoln Award in the area of education from the Governor of Illinois in 2005. She is a Fellow of the Royal Society of Arts. She was awarded honorary degrees from Illinois Wesleyan University, Aurora University, and North Central College.

== Personal life ==
Marshall was married to educator Robert Dean Marshall before his death in 2014.

== Selected works ==
- Gould, Stephen Jay (2003). Marshall, Stephanie; Scheppler, Judith A.; Palmisano, Michael J. (eds.). Science literacy for the twenty-first century. Amherst, N.Y.: Prometheus Books. ISBN 1-59102-020-4. OCLC 50754815.
- Marshall, Stephanie Pace (2006). The Power to Transform: Leadership That Brings Learning and Schooling to Life. John Wiley & Sons. ISBN 978-0-7879-7501-2.
