= Limestone High School =

Coordinates: 46°54′24″N 67°49′46″W

Limestone High School is a former high school in the town of Limestone, Maine. It changed to Limestone Community School and incorporated grades K-12 when nearby Loring Air Force Base closed and is now also home to the Maine School of Science and Mathematics.

== Overview ==
More than 3/4ths of the students were from Loring Air Force Base, and this meant that the staff numbered around fifty-five. Classrooms also included fully stocked laboratories, and French and Spanish. There were no fraternities and sororities at the school, though. A variety of sports were offered, and there was an Olympic-sized swimming pool available for swimmers. One feature that was unique to the school was the annual potato harvest break. Towards the end of September, a three-week break would begin for those in grades nine through twelve, to allow for the harvesting of potatoes in the surrounding area. The students still were able to complete their 180 required days, and the last day of school often fell in the first week of June.
