= Joe Craft =

American businessman (born 1950)

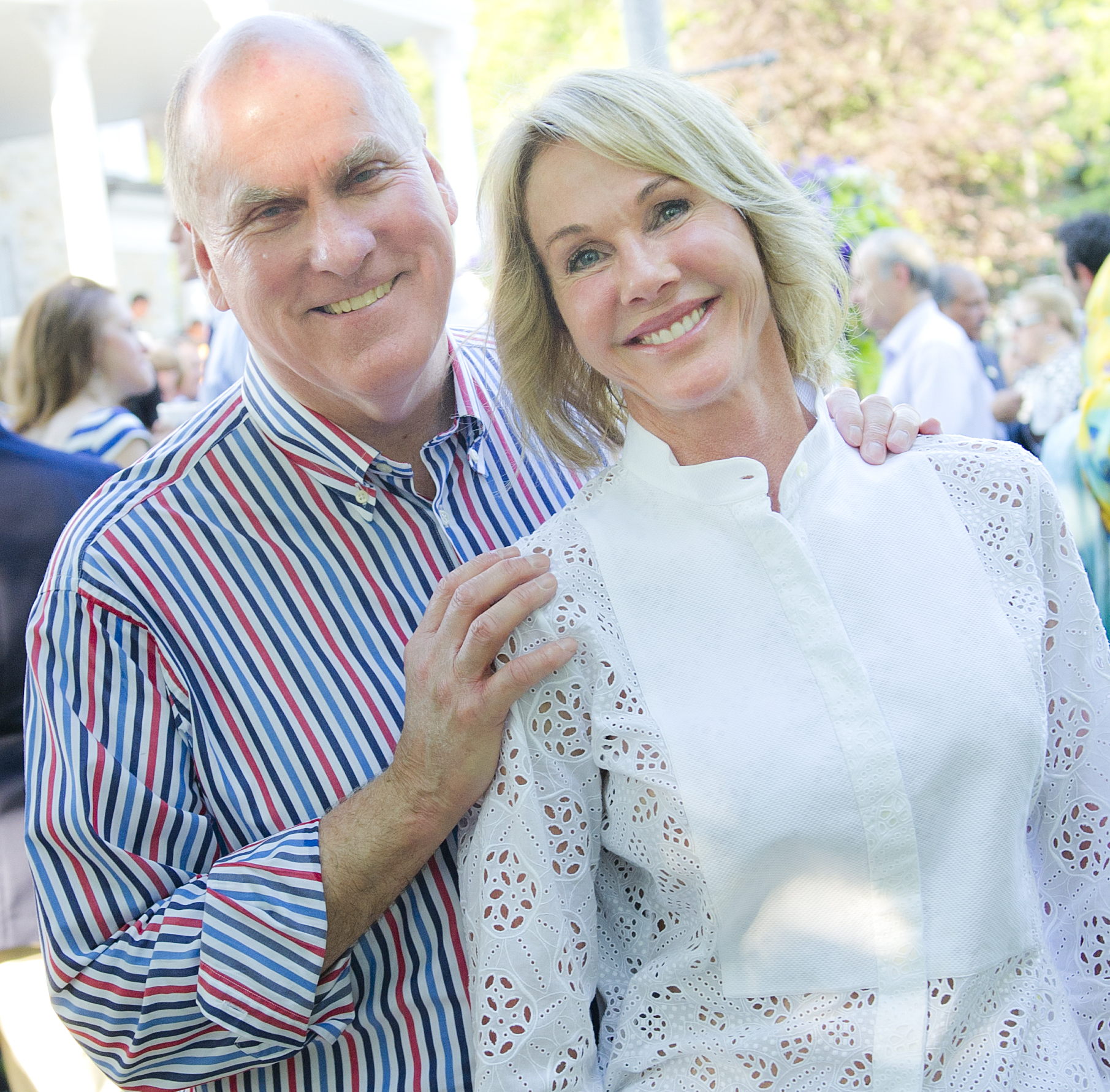
- Joe and Kelly Craft in 2018
- Born: October 13, 1950 (age 75); Hazard, Kentucky, U.S.
- Education: University of Kentucky (BS, JD)
- Occupation: Businessman
- Employer(s): Alliance Resource Partners, L.P.
- Spouse: Kelly Guilfoil Knight (m. 2016)
- Children: 4

Joseph Craft III (born 1950) is an American businessman. He is the president and chief executive officer of Alliance Resource Partners, L.P., the third-largest coal producer in the eastern United States.

== Personal life ==
Craft received an undergraduate degree in accounting in 1972 from the University of Kentucky, and then earned a JD degree in 1976 from the University of Kentucky College of Law. Craft was a member of the Sigma Alpha Epsilon fraternity.

Craft's wife, businesswoman and former US Alternate Delegate to the United Nations Kelly Craft, was in 2017 appointed as the U.S. Ambassador to Canada by Donald Trump. In 2019 she became the United States Ambassador to the United Nations, also appointed by President Trump. The couple have six children and, as of 2018, 11 grandchildren.

== Career ==
Craft began his career at Mapco Inc, a pipeline company that had diversified into other energy sectors, based in Tulsa, Oklahoma. In 1985, he was elected senior vice president of legal and finance. In 1986, Craft became head of the coal division at Mapco.

In 1996, Craft led a management buyout of the unit. The buyout involved Mapco selling a 75% stake in the coal division to the Beacon Group Energy Investment Fund. The new company was called Alliance Coal LLC.

In 1999, he led the effort to take Alliance public. In August 1999, he became president and chief executive of Alliance. In January 2019, while already president and chief executive officer of Alliance Resource Partners' general partner, he also assumed the additional role of chairman of the general partner's board of directors.

In 2019, Alliance started mining under I-70 near the West Virginia state line with Pennsylvania. The long wall mining is expected to last until 2038.

== Political activism ==
The Lexington Herald-Leader reported that Craft had given more money to Democratic candidates at the state level of office between 2008 and 2019 than to Republican candidates. In January 2012, Craft donated around $500,000 to Restore Our Future, a Super PAC supporting Mitt Romney.

Craft is an ally and donor to Donald Trump. On July 11, 2016, Craft hosted a private fundraiser for Donald Trump at the Aviation Museum of Kentucky. Through a trust, Craft contributed more than $2 million to the Trump presidential inaugural committee.

Craft is reported to have lobbied Trump administration officials in the U.S. Environmental Protection Agency to overturn environmental protections of the Clean Power Plan that limited emissions of lead and other toxic substances from coal-burning power plants.

== Philanthropy ==
In 2015 Joe Craft and his wife Kelly Craft co-founded the Craft Academy for Excellence in Science and Mathematics at Kentucky's Morehead State University, a special program for academically exceptional high school students. By 2019 they had committed over $10 million to the academy.

After Craft pledged $6 million toward the completion of the project, the Joe Craft Center, a state-of-the-art basketball practice facility for the Kentucky Wildcats men's and women's basketball teams, was named for him. This was the largest private gift in the history of UK Athletics.

The Joe Craft Tower, a wing of the Hazard ARH Hospital in Hazard, was completed and opened in 2014. Craft donated $1 million to the project.

In 2014, he donated $5 million for "A Gathering Place for Tulsa", a park to be built along the city's Arkansas River waterfront.

In 2016, he donated $4.8 million for the construction of the facility housing the day-to-day University of Kentucky football operation.

In 2019, he made a $3 million gift to support the Institute for the Study of Free Enterprise, in the Gatton College of Business and Economics, of the University of Kentucky.

In 2022, he made a $7.5 million gift to renovate the University of Kentucky football team's indoor practice facility.

Craft has taken the Giving Pledge, pledging "to give the vast majority of my resources to philanthropic causes and charitable endeavors targeted to people and organizations that embrace individual responsibility, economic freedom, reducing poverty and providing opportunities for those willing to chase the American dream."

== Awards ==
Craft was inducted into the Tulsa Hall of Fame in 2007. In 2008, Craft was named the Ernst & Young Entrepreneur of the Year for the Southwest Region energy, chemical, and mining category. In 2009, Craft was inducted into the University of Tulsa's Collins College of Business Hall of Fame. In 2010, he was inducted into the University of Kentucky College of Law Hall of Fame. In 2018, he was inducted into the Kentucky Entrepreneur Hall of Fame.

== See also ==
- Coal mining in the United States
