= Daniel P. Aldrich =

American political scientist

- Born: 1974 (age 51–52)
- Education: University of North Carolina at Chapel Hill (BA); University of California at Berkeley (MA); Harvard University (MA, PhD)
- Known for: Role of social capital in crisis
- Awards: Morehead-Cain Fellowship, FLAS Fellowship, NSF Graduate Fellowship, Fulbright Fellowships (3), Klein Lecture
- Scientific career
- Fields: Political science
- Workplaces: Northeastern University

Daniel P. Aldrich (born 1974) is an academic in the fields of political science, public policy and Asian studies. He is currently full professor of political science and public policy at Northeastern University. Aldrich has held several Fulbright fellowships, including a Fulbright Distinguished Chair in Applied Public Policy (Democratic Resilience) at Flinders University in Australia in 2023, a Fulbright Specialist in Trinidad-Tobago in 2018, a Fulbright research fellowship at the University of Tokyo's Economic's Department for the 2012–2013 academic year, and a IIE Fulbright Dissertation Fellowship in Tokyo in 2002–2003. His research, prompted in part by his own family's experience of Hurricane Katrina, explores how communities around the world respond to and recover from disaster.

Much of Aldrich's research has explored the interaction between social networks, public policy, and the environment. His research interests include comparative politics, nuclear power, disaster recovery, and countering violent extremism. One of his main contributions has been the argument that social capital serves as the critical engine for post-disaster recovery and that these ties are more important than factors such as damage from the event, wealth, or investment in physical infrastructure. His work has been cited by organizations such as Facebook, the Red Cross, the Ukrainian government, NYC Emergency Management, the Legal Services Corporation, the Israeli legislature, and the City Club of Portland in their focus on the role of social ties during disaster. He has also worked extensively on interactions between civil society, social networks, and the state, especially in the siting of controversial facilities.

Aldrich's earlier research focused on Japan's nuclear power program. He has been interviewed extensively in the press as an expert on this subject. Aldrich's ongoing work includes a focus on social infrastructure, that is, the facilities and places that help people meet, build trust and create and maintain social capital

== Early life and education ==
Aldrich, after graduating from the North Carolina School of Science and Mathematics, completed his B.A. (1996) at the University of North Carolina at Chapel Hill as a Morehead Scholar (highest honors, Phi Beta Kappa). He earned an M.A. in Asian Studies from the University of California at Berkeley in 1998 and then received his M.A. (2001) and Ph.D. (2005) from the Government Department at Harvard University where Susan Pharr was his main adviser.

== Career ==
In 2005 Aldrich became assistant professor at Tulane University in New Orleans, Louisiana, but the university was suspended for the Fall semester because of Hurricane Katrina, a story covered by several media outlets. He resumed at Tulane in Spring 2006, and then became an Advanced Research Fellow at Harvard University's Program on U.S.-Japan Relations in the fall of 2006.

In the Fall of 2007 he became an Abe Research Professor at the University of Tokyo where he researched the role of social networks in disaster recovery. In the fall of 2008 he began work as an assistant professor of political science at Purdue University in West Lafayette, Indiana.

He earned tenure in the spring of 2011, and then went on leave from Purdue, heading first to the East West Center in Honolulu, Hawaii as a visiting fellow, and then to become a Science and Technology Fellow through the American Association for the Advancement of Science (AAAS) at the United States Agency for International Development (USAID).

In the fall of 2012 he moved to Tokyo, Japan on a Fulbright research fellowship to study the recovery from the 3/11 compound disaster in Tohoku, Japan. He returned to Purdue in the fall of 2013, becoming full professor in the spring of 2015.

He began work as a professor at Northeastern University in the fall of 2015, teaching undergraduate and graduate courses on Environmental Politics, Resilient Cities, East Asian Politics, and Security and Resilience Policy along with a seminar in the field known as a Dialogue of Civilizations focused on Disasters and Recovery in Japan.

== Selected works ==
Aldrich is the author or co-author of five books and more than 125 peer-reviewed articles. His citation rate has been sufficient to place him in the Political Science 400, a list of the most-cited scholars in the field. He has also written news and opinion pieces for various news outlets and magazines.

=== Books ===
- Beyond Common Ground: How Everyday Places Solve Big Social Challenges. Berkeley: University of California Press (2026)
- Black Wave: How Connections and Governance Shaped Japan's 3/11 Disasters. Chicago: University of Chicago Press (2019) [Winner, Japan NPO Research Association Award for Outstanding Book]
- Building Resilience: Social Capital in Post-Disaster Recovery. Chicago: University of Chicago Press (2012). Japanese translation from Minerva (2014). [Japan NPO Research Association Award for Outstanding Book]
- Site Fights: Divisive Facilities and Civil Society in Japan and the West. Ithaca and London: Cornell University Press, (first edition) 2008, (second edition) 2010. Japanese translation from Sekaishisōsha (2012).
- Asian Disasters: Community Ties, Market Mechanisms, and Governance. New York: Springer Press (with Sothea Oum and Yasuyuki Sawada) (2014)
- Healthy, Resilient, and Sustainable Communities after Disasters: Strategies, Opportunities, and Planning for Recovery. Institute of Medicine and National Academies of Science (2015).

=== Selected articles ===
- "Capturing Bonding, Bridging, and Linking Social Capital through Publicly Available Data," Risks, Hazards, and Crises in Public Policy, 11(1): 61–86 with Dean Kyne 2020
- "Substitute or complement? How social capital, age and socioeconomic status interacted to impact mortality in Japan's 3/11 tsunami," SSM – Population Health Vol 7 with Maoxin Ye 2019
- “The Power of People: Social Capital's Role in Recovery from the 1995 Kobe Earthquake,” Natural Hazards, Vol. 56 No. 3 2011 pp. 595–611
- “Strong Civil Society as a Double-Edged Sword: Siting Trailers in Post-Katrina New Orleans,” Political Research Quarterly, Volume 61, No. 3, September 2008, pp. 379–389 (with Kevin Crook)
- “Fixing Recovery: Social Capital in Post-Crisis Resilience,” Journal of Homeland Security, Volume 6, June 2010, pp. 1– 10
- “The Externalities of Social Capital: Post-Tsunami Recovery in Southeast India,” Journal of Civil Society, Vol. 8 No. 1 2011 pp. 81–99
- “Mars and Venus at Twilight: A Critical Investigation of Moralism, Age Effects, and Sex Differences,” Political Psychology, Volume 24, March 2003, pp. 23–40 (with Rieko Kage
- “Social, Not Physical, Infrastructure: The Critical Role of Civil Society in Disaster Recovery,” Disasters: The Journal of Disaster Studies, Policy and Management Vol. 36 Issue 3 July 2012 pp. 398–419 . Winner, Best Paper Award, APSA Public Policy Section.
