= Julia Link Roberts =

American scholar of gifted education

Julia Link Roberts is an American scholar of gifted education. In 2004, she was described as one of the fifty-five most influential people in the field. She is the Mahurin Professor of Gifted Studies at Western Kentucky University, and the executive director of The Center for Gifted Studies at Western Kentucky University and The Carol Martin Gatton Academy of Mathematics and Science in Kentucky.

== Education ==
Roberts holds a BA from the University of Missouri, and an MA and a doctorate in education from Oklahoma State University.

== Career ==
Roberts started her career at Western Kentucky University in 1974. She founded the Center for Gifted Studies there in 1983, and was instrumental in starting the Kentucky Association for Gifted Education in 1979. After working as an assistant professor and associate professor, she was appointed as a full professor of teacher education in 1989. She received and was director of several grants from the Jacob K. Javits Gifted and Talented Students Education Program to research the education of gifted students, including "Restructuring Primary Gifted Education", "Enhancing Educational Opportunities for Gifted Middle School Students", and students from low-income districts and students with English as a second language who were tutored in problem-based lessons in math and science. She led a ten-year advocacy campaign that resulted in establishing the Gatton Academy of Mathematics and Science, a statewide residential school founded in 2007. She is President of the World Council for Gifted and Talented Children, having been elected to its executive committee in 2009. She has been a member of the World Council for Gifted and Talented Children since 1986, and has attended 13 World Conferences sponsored by the WCGTC, and was previously its treasurer. She is chairperson of The Kentucky Advisory Counsel for Gifted Education, and a member of Kentucky's Prichard Committee for Academic Excellence. She is the co-author with Tracy Inman of the book Strategies for Differentiating Instruction: Best Practices for the Classroom.

== Awards ==
- 2001 David W. Belin Advocacy Award from the National Association for Gifted Children (NAGC), for her advocacy work
- 2009 Legacy Award for outstanding book for educators in gifted education by the Texas Association for the Gifted and Talented, for the book Strategies for Differentiating Instruction: Best Practices for the Classroom
- 2012, role model by the Wilderness Road Council of Girl Scouts of Kentucky, as part of their centennial
- Acorn Award (2011) by the Kentucky Council on Postsecondary Education as the outstanding professor at a Kentucky four-year university
- 2012, National Association for Gifted Children Service Award
- 2015, Distinguished Educator Award by the Kentucky Association of Teacher Educators
- 2015, recipient of The Institute for the Development of Gifted Education's (IDGE)Palmarium Award.
