= Barry Goldwater Scholarship and Excellence in Education Foundation =

American merit-based scholarship awarded to prospective scientists

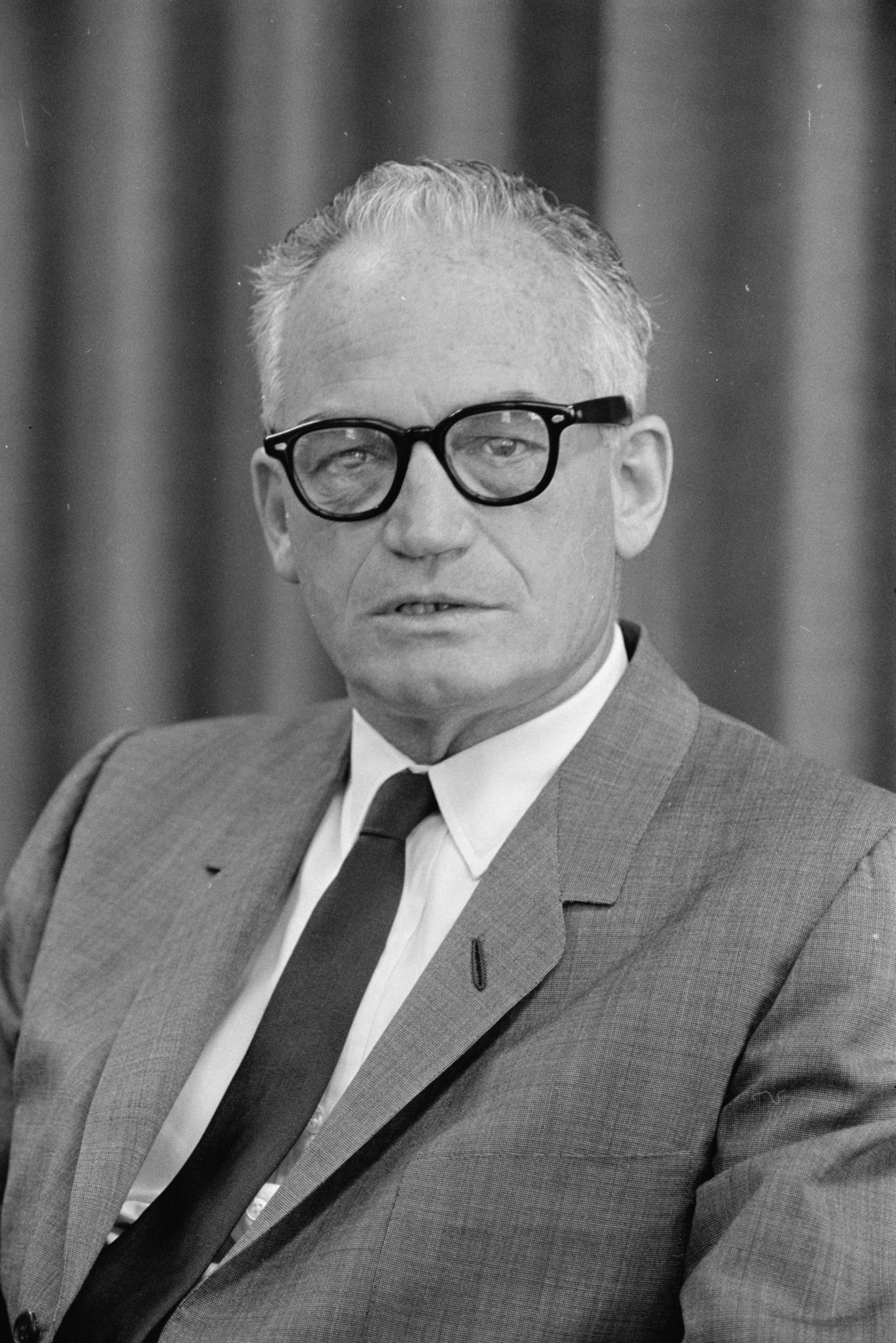
The scholarship is named for Senator Barry Goldwater (pictured 1962).

The Barry Goldwater Scholarship and Excellence in Education Foundation was established by the United States Congress in 1986 in honor of former United States Senator and 1964 presidential candidate Barry Goldwater. By providing scholarships to college sophomores and juniors who intend to pursue research careers in the natural sciences, mathematics, and engineering, the Goldwater Foundation seeks to ensure that the U.S. is producing the number of highly-qualified professionals the Nation needs in these critical fields.

The scholarship is awarded annually to about 500 college sophomores and juniors out of approximately 1,300 nominees. The scholarship is awarded based on merit and the actual amount given is based on financial need, up to a maximum of $7,500 per academic year. In addition, from 2001 to 2018, about 50 exceptional applicants not awarded the scholarship have been recognized with official Honorable Mentions each year.

Colleges and universities may nominate up to four undergraduate students per year for consideration. A fifth student can be nominated if one or more of the nominees is a transfer student or a veteran. A sixth student can be nominated if a transfer student and a veteran are nominated. Most applicants are seeking PhDs. Those who also wish to practice medicine must demonstrate a clear commitment to research.

In awarding scholarships, the Foundation considers the field of study, career objectives, commitment, and potential for a significant professional contribution. This is judged by letters of reference, student essays, and prior research experience. The number of scholarships per region depends on the number and qualifications of the nominees for that region. The regions are defined as each of the 50 U.S. states, the District of Columbia, Puerto Rico, Guam, United States Virgin Islands, American Samoa, Commonwealth of the Northern Mariana Islands, Republic of the Marshall Islands, Federated States of Micronesia, Republic of Palau, and any other territory or possession of the United States; or a permanent resident.

== Leadership ==
=== Board of Trustees ===
The board of trustees is composed of 13 members, 8 of which are appointed by the president of the United States with the consent of the United States Senate. No more than four of the presidentially-appointed members may be affiliated with the same political party. These members are appointed to terms of six years, but they may continue to serve on the board until a successor is confirmed.

Four trustees are members of Congress, two members each from the Senate and the House of Representatives. One member is appointed by the majority leader, the minority leader of the Senate, the majority leader, and the minority leader of the House, respectively. These members may not serve on the board for more than a total of six years.

In addition, the U.S. Secretary of Education, or their designee, serves as an ex officio member of the board, though they are ineligible to serve as chairman.

=== Current Board Members ===
The current board members as of April 26, 2026:

Position	Name	Party	Assumed office	Term expiration
Chair	John H. Yopp	Democratic	September 26, 2011	October 13, 2017
Member	Stewart DeSoto	Republican	January 1, 2013	August 11, 2016
Member	Peggy Goldwater Clay	Republican	April 6, 1995	June 5, 2012
Member	Joseph M. Green	Democratic	December 18, 2021	March 3, 2028
Member	Charlie Korsmo	Republican	September 26, 2011	October 13, 2017
Member	Maria E. Rengifo-Ruess	Democratic	September 26, 2011	February 4, 2014
Member	Vacant	Democratic		
Member	Vacant	Republican		
Member	Burgess Owens	Republican	November 18, 2025	January 3, 2027
Member	John B. Larson	Democratic	April 7, 2023	January 3, 2027
Member	Vacant	Republican		
Member	Mark Kelly	Democratic	April 4, 2025	January 3, 2029
Member (ex officio)	Linda McMahon	Republican	March 3, 2025	—

=== Foundation President and Executive Secretary ===
The board appoints an Executive Secretary of the Foundation, who serves as the President of the Foundation and carries out its functions, subject to the supervision and direction of the board.

John Mateja has served as the third President of the Foundation since 2016.

==== Past presidents ====
The past presidents and executive secretaries of the foundation:

- W. Franklin Gilmore (2012–2015)
- Gerald J. Smith (1988–2011)

== Change in number of scholarships awarded, 2019 ==
In 2019, the Barry Goldwater Scholarship and Excellence in Education Foundation partnered with the Department of Defense National Defense Education Programs (NDEP) to dramatically increase the number of scholarships offered from the historical average of 15-20% of nominees at the national level to over 40%. This awarded a Goldwater scholarship to all students who would have received an Honorable Mention in previous years. A new program associated with the award is its veterans’ initiative. Institutions will, instead of being limited to nominating 4 students, be able to nominate a 5th student if one of the nominees is a veteran.

== Changes implemented in 2020 ==
- Nomination materials will now be reviewed by discipline instead of state of residence.
- Four-year schools that present a transfer student as a nominee can also nominate an additional (5th) student.
- Institutions cannot reduce a student's institutionally-controlled scholarship funding after a student receives the Goldwater award.
- The Foundation will no longer reduce a student’s Goldwater award if the student receives additional scholarship funding during the same year.
