= Maine School of Science and Mathematics =

Magnet school in Maine, United States

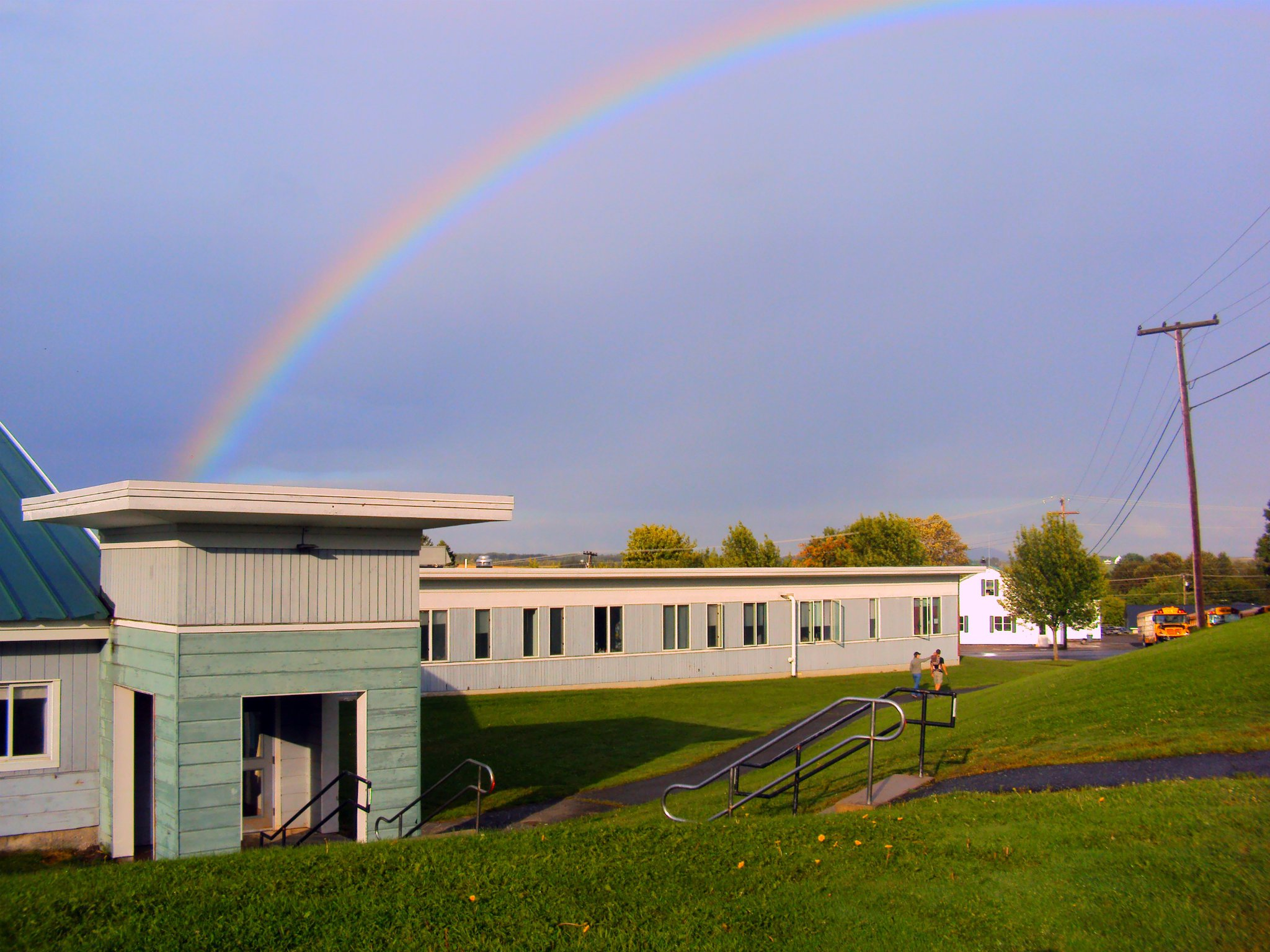
- A rainbow cast over the MSSM dormitory in August 2011, prior to its repainting in late 2012.

Location
- 95 High Street; Limestone, Maine; United States
- Coordinates: 46°54′28″N 67°49′43″W

Information
- School type: Magnet School
- Established: 1995
- Authority: State of Maine
- Director: Sam Critchlow
- Enrollment: 129 (2022)
- Student to teacher ratio: 11:1
- Mascot: Penguin
- USNWR ranking: 2,355th (National) (2022)
- Website: www.mssm.org

The Maine School of Science and Mathematics (MSSM) is a public residential magnet high school in Limestone, Maine, United States.

MSSM serves students from all over the state of Maine, as well as youth from other states and international students. It is a public high school for students in grades 9–12, and its summer program is for boys and girls from grades 5–9. MSSM is an all-residential boarding school with a total capacity of 156 students.

The school is a member of the National Consortium of Secondary STEM Schools (NCSSS).

== History ==
After the announcement that Loring Air Force Base would be closed, funding from the Defense Reauthorization Bill provided for the creation of the Maine School of Science and Mathematics at the site of Limestone High School, which was going to lose many of its students upon the closure of the base. The town's elementary school was eventually converted into dormitories for the school, as they are located on the same property. MSSM continues to share the former Limestone High School building with the local Limestone Community School. Each school occupies approximately half of the building. Due to their small size and physical proximity, the two schools also share most of their sports teams. In 2014, the school acquired a new dormitory, dubbed "Limestone Manor", in the center of town. The building housed a nursing home until the business relocated in 2013. As of 2014, the Limestone Manor, a male-only dormitory, houses close to 30 students.

Chartered and funded by the Maine Legislature, MSSM opened with a pioneer class in 1995. At that time, it was only the eleventh statewide residential magnet school specializing in mathematics and science education in the United States and the only school of its kind in New England. Both remain true today. It is the only magnet school currently operating in Maine.

== National ranking ==
In 2013, U.S. News & World Report ranked MSSM 13th on its list of "America's Best High Schools," a ranking of public high schools in the United States. In 2017, it was ranked 19th; and in 2019, it was ranked second. In 2022, it was ranked 2,355th.
