= Craft Academy for Excellence in Science and Mathematics =

Residential school in Kentucky, United States

Location
- 260 University Blvd. Morehead, Kentucky 40351; United States; 38.187956°N 83.433805°W

Information
- Type: Public, boarding, dual enrollment
- Motto: Imagining. Inventing. Impacting Kentucky.
- Established: 2014; 12 years ago
- CEEB code: 181849
- Director: Aaron Collins
- Grades: 11–12
- Enrollment: 146 (April 2021)
- Colors: Blue and Gold
- Athletics: Intramural only
- Website: www.moreheadstate.edu/craft-academy

The Craft Academy for Excellence in Science and Mathematics (simply Craft Academy) is a two-year residential early college high school serving approximately 146 academically exceptional high school juniors and seniors at Morehead State University (MSU) in Morehead, Kentucky. The students live in Craft Tower and earn dual credits as they complete their last two years of high school at the Academy while at the same time taking at least 60 credit hours of college-level courses, with tuition, room and board, and meal plan all free of charge. The Academy is funded in large part by Joe Craft and Ambassador Kelly Craft, who have donated over $10 million to the Academy, the largest donation in MSU history.

== Founding and funding ==
Kelly Craft and Joe Craft co-founded the Craft Academy for Excellence in Science and Mathematics in 2015. It is a two-year residential early college high school serving approximately 146 academically exceptional high school juniors and seniors at Morehead State University (MSU). When students complete the two-year program, they will have earned both a high school diploma and at least 60 college credit hours, free of charge. Tuition, room and board, and meal plan are free for students.

The Crafts' initial $4 million pledge in support of the Academy was the single-largest cash gift in the history of MSU. In 2019, Joe Craft and his wife Kelly Craft committed an additional $3.5 million across five years. By 2019 they had committed over $10 million to the Academy. Their contributions to the Academy are the largest donation in MSU history.

The Academy is supported by a public-private partnership between the Crafts and the Commonwealth of Kentucky.

== History ==
Students live in Craft Tower on campus and take MSU classes during their time at the Academy, graduating with a Craft Academy high school diploma as well as at least 60 hours of MSU college credit. The Craft Academy specializes in providing "a unique academic and social high school experience that will better prepare [students] for college".

The first graduating Class of 2017 included 55 students. The Academy originally admitted 60 students to each of the first five classes, but has begun increasing class size in accordance with an increase in state funding.

In 2019, the Academy graduated its third class, with an average ACT score of 31. Of its 50 graduates, 35 scored 31 or higher.

In 2021, it was named among the top elite public schools in the nation by The Washington Post Education Editor Jay Mathews, and was certified by Cognia, provider of assessment services, as an elite STEM (science, technology, engineering, and math) program.

The Academy admitted 69 students to its Class of 2023.

The Academy was formerly located in Grote-Thompson Hall, but has since moved to the recently renovated Craft Tower (formerly Alumni Tower).

== See also ==
- Early entrance to college
