= Indiana Academy for Science, Mathematics, and Humanities =

The Indiana Academy for Science, Mathematics, and Humanities

Location
- 301 North Talley Street; Muncie, Indiana 47306; United States; 40°11′47″N 85°24′37″W

Information
- Type: Public secondary school
- Established: 1988
- Oversight: Ball State University
- Director: Dain Kavars
- Teaching staff: 30.00 (on an FTE basis)
- Grades: 10-12
- Enrollment: 209 (2024-2025)
- Student to teacher ratio: 6.83
- Website: academy.bsu.edu

The Indiana Academy for Science, Mathematics, and Humanities (The Indiana Academy) is a nationally ranked public boarding magnet high school located on the campus of Ball State University in Muncie, Indiana. The Academy offers both residential and non-residential (commuter) options for juniors and seniors. In the 2022–2023 academic year, a non-residential-only program for high school sophomores was added.

The Indiana Academy was founded in 1988 by the Indiana General Assembly. and is a part of Ball State's Teachers College. The first group of Academy juniors started in the fall of 1990.

== Athletics ==
The Academy's athletes participate in sports with the teams of Burris Laboratory School.
