= Charles W. Coker =

American businessman (1933–2024)

Charles Westfield Coker (May 10, 1933 – June 27, 2024) was an American businessman who was the president and CEO of Sonoco Products Company of Hartsville, South Carolina. He also served as a director of Bank of America, Sara Lee Corporation, HanesBrands Inc., Springs Industries, and Carolina Power & Light Company (now Progress Energy Inc.), and as chairman of the board of Hollings Cancer Center at the Medical University of South Carolina. Along with being initiated into the South Carolina Business Hall of Fame, Coker has been granted South Carolina's highest philanthropic honor, the Order of the Palmetto.

Coker was the son of Charles W. and Elizabeth Howard Coker and the great-grandson of S.C. Business Hall of Fame honoree Major James Lide Coker, who founded Coker College and Sonoco after the Coker farm was destroyed in March 1865. Founded as a paper mill, Sonoco is now one of the world's major producers of different types of commercial and consumer product packaging. When Charlie Coker succeeded his father as president in 1970, Sonoco had annual sales of $125 million, there were 6,000 employees, and its operations totaled 61. By 1998, when he moved from chief executive officer and chairman of the board, Sonoco had annual sales of $2.56 billion and its 16,500 employees were stationed at more than 275 locations in 85 countries on five continents.

After attending Woodberry Forest School in Orange, Virginia, Coker received an A.B. in history from Princeton University in 1955 after completing a 164-page senior thesis titled "Coleman Livingston Blease – South Carolina Demagogue." He later received an M.B.A. from Harvard Business School. Coker is married to South Carolina civic leader Joan F. Sasser, and they have six children: Charles, Ellen, Howard, Carrie, Margaret, and Thomas, and 20 grandchildren.

Coker died on June 27, 2024, at the age of 91.

== Sources ==
- Sara Lee Corporation - Board of Directors Retrieved on 13 April 2006
- Hanesbrands Inc - Board of Directors Retrieved on 7 February 2007
- South Carolina Business Hall of Fame Retrieved on 7 February 2007
- Forbes Bio Retrieved on 7 February 2007
