= David Coker =

David Coker may refer to:

- David Robert Coker, agricultural reformer
- Mrs. David R. Coker, founder of Kalmia Gardens
- Dave Coker, musician in Wubble-U

== See also ==
- David Coke, British aviator
