= Patrick Earl Hammie =

American visual artist and educator (born 1981)

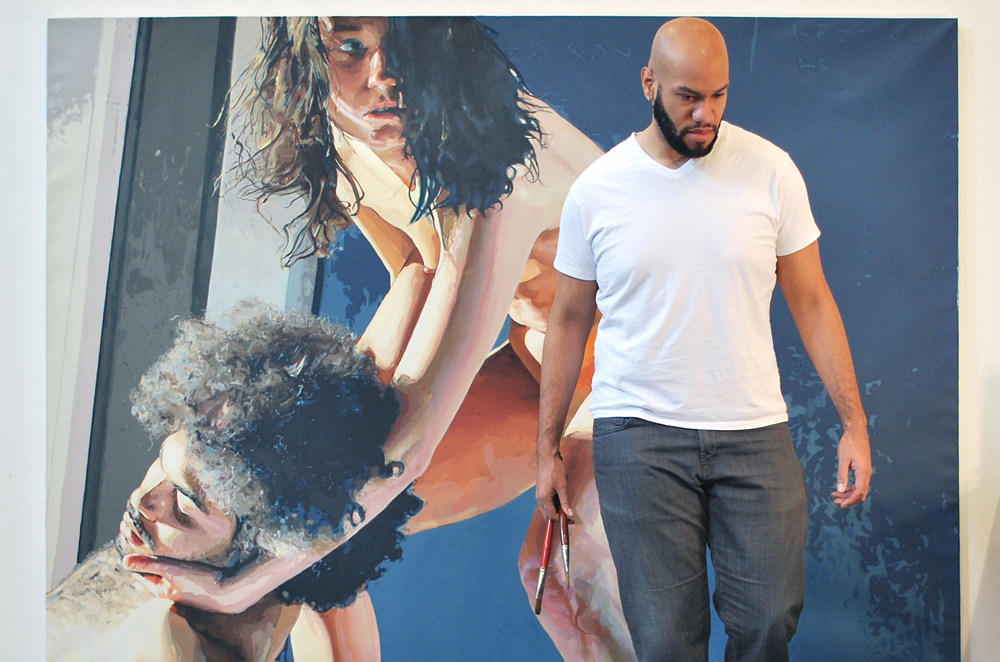
- Patrick Earl Hammie in his studio in 2011.
- Born: November 23, 1981 (age 44); New Haven, Connecticut, U.S.
- Known for: Painting; Drawing
- Website: PatrickEarlHammie.com

Patrick Earl Hammie (born November 23, 1981) is an American visual artist and educator best known for his large-scale portrait and nude paintings of allegorical subjects. Hammie's paintings emphasize movement, color, and sensuality, drawing from art history and visual culture to examine ideas related to cultural identity, masculinity, beauty, and sexuality. Hammie lives in Champaign, where he currently works as an Associate Professor at the University of Illinois Urbana-Champaign.

== Early life and education ==
Hammie was born in New Haven, Connecticut, and raised in West Haven, to mother Carolyn (née Harrison), a retired switchboard operator, and father Ervin Hammie Jr., a Vietnam War veteran, foreman, and gravedigger. As a child, Hammie took up martial arts and was nationally ranked in his category by the North American Sports Karate Association. He developed an interest in visual arts when he began drawing characters from comic books and television shows. Hammie's parents supported him in both areas, bringing him to karate tournaments and encouraging him to expand his drawings to include still lives and landscapes. At age nine, Hammie relocated with his parents to Hartsville, South Carolina. His parents separated when he was thirteen and he returned with his father to Connecticut to attend West Haven High School, where he played football and performed in the choir. Hammie's father died in 1999, shortly after Hammie's high school graduation.

After high school, Hammie attended Coker College and studied studio art, where he received a BA in 2004. Hammie freelanced as a portrait painter for two years before returning to New England to study at the University of Connecticut, where he received his MFA in 2008.

== Career ==
=== Imperfect Colossi ===
Hammie's artistic direction began to take shape in 2007, when he considered his reaction to his father's untimely death in 1999. According to Hammie, “I’d become emotionally reserved, which led me to question the source of this behavior and art’s role in representing and nurturing such masculine traits.” This reflection inspired Hammie; he painted his un-idealized brown body as the antithesis of the hard-bodied heroes of Old Master imagery. In his 2007 painting, Protuberance, Hammie portrays himself pulling and tugging at his bulky loose flesh, laying the groundwork for his first project Imperfect Colossi. This series of paintings and drawings visualize Hammie's effort to reshape himself and propose the possibility of a new ideal, one positioned more as a work in progress than an achievable end.

On April 12, 2008 Hammie premiered selections from Imperfect Colossi at the William Benton Museum of Art. On May 20, Hammie displayed selections at Kathleen Cullen Gallery in New York City. In May, he was awarded the Alice C. Cole ‘42 Fellowship and a 12-month residency from Wellesley College, which supported the creation of new works to be exhibited at the end of the residency.

=== Equivalent Exchange ===
Beginning in December 2008, Hammie painted a series of self-portraits perched atop stools and unstable pedestals. Hammie was inspired by images of America's first black president's authoritative pose at the lectern, and their connection to the visual legacy of the enslaved black body on the auction block. The painting Recognition from 2009 depicts a backlit hulking man sitting atop a stool, turning his body to peer out at the viewer. The figure's face is obscured by a shadow that interrupts the viewer's gaze. Hammie pictures a figure in the process of confronting the heritage of a black male body, and on the verge of moving from objecthood to subjecthood.

On April 1, 2009 Hammie debuted the project Equivalent Exchange in his first solo exhibition at the Jewett Art Gallery at Wellesley College. On August 16, 2009, Hammie accepted a faculty position in the School of Art + Design at the University of Illinois at Urbana-Champaign.

On January 11, 2010 Hammie displayed selections from Imperfect Colossi and Equivalent Exchange in a solo exhibition at Stewart Center Gallery at Purdue University.

=== John Michael Kohler Art Center ===
In July 2011, Hammie left his studio to complete the arts/industry residency program at the John Michael Kohler Arts Center. For three months, Hammie used the industrial materials and equipment at the Kohler Company to create drawings, casts, and sculptures of calla lilies and his body.

=== Significant Other ===
Hammie returned to his studio from his Kohler residency in September 2011 and began production on paintings that question inherited visual expectations of historically marginalized people, and work to reorient how meaning is made around those bodies. Encouraged by the communal environment at Kohler, Hammie worked with studio assistants and collaborated with art historians and museum directors toward his “conceptual sequel to Imperfect Colossi.” According to Hammie, traditional representations of women and people of color in art, and present effects of institutional exclusion of minority groups from authorship of their cultural and political narratives informed this direction.

Significant Other, Hammie's third project, opened with select works on July 26, 2013 at Greymatter Gallery in Milwaukee. In contrast to his previous project, which showed a minimalist depiction of a single male figure, Significant Other presents male and female figures locked in a physical exchange. Paintings such as Aureole from 2013 feature a commanding woman rotating a reclined man's body to his side, baring his nakedness and inspecting his state of consciousness. Hammie introduces the woman as an active authority and relieves the man from macho performance, constructing moments where traditionally masculine and feminine strengths are conflated in the woman's actions while the man's body and its classic signifier of power—the penis—is vulnerable to public critique.

On February 7, 2014 Hammie displayed selections from Significant Other in a solo exhibition at Porter Butts Gallery at the University of Wisconsin-Madison. On March 22, Hammie's Bust of an American Man [early 21st century] was displayed in the John Michael Kohler Arts Center's 40th anniversary retrospective, which featured 40 years of collected works by arts/industry residents.

On August 16, 2015 Hammie was promoted to the rank of Associate Professor at the University of Illinois at Urbana-Champaign.

On February 25, 2016 Hammie displayed selections from Significant Other in a solo exhibition at Kruger Gallery in Chicago.

=== Other Works ===
One of Hammie's portraits was featured in the exhibition, What's Inside Her Never Dies... A Black Woman's Legacy at Yeleen Gallery for their Art Basel Miami showcase in January 2016.

== Art ==
Hammie's use of scale, expression, and emotive subject matter recall the painterly gestures of the Baroque and Romantic periods. His style has been compared to that of Rubens. Hammie's oeuvre is defined by his ongoing engagement with the history of painting, in particular his use of allegory to implicate power structures, question systems of racism and sexism, and examine how male artists have imagined the nude. Since debuting in 2009, Hammie has dedicated his career to traditional figurative painting, investigating the pictorial, technical, and narrative practices of Western art, producing portraits that disturb the existing canon and examine critical aspects of gender and race today.

Hammie works primarily in a studio, painting from life and photographs. Hammie's subjects are often himself and the people in his life: friends, family, and fellow artists. Music is central to his creative practice. He cites Bjork, Oddisee, and Daft Punk as musical groups he listens to while working.

== Awards ==
Hammie has been awarded prizes and grants from Alliance of Artists Communities with the Joyce Foundation, Indianapolis Art Center, Tanne Foundation, University of Illinois, Wellesley College, and Zhou B Art Center.

== Collections ==
Hammie's work is held in permanent collections including Del Mar College, John Michael Kohler Art Center, JPMorgan Chase Art Collection, Kohler Company, Kinsey Institute at Indiana University, and the William Benton Museum of Art.

== Influences ==
Hammie has stated on several occasions visual artists that have influenced his artistic career. He cites Francis Bacon, Luís Caballero, Caravaggio, Renée Cox, Marlene Dumas, Lucian Freud, Leon Golub, Jacob Lawrence, Robert Mapplethorpe, and Kerry James Marshall as some of his favorite artists.
