= David Robert Coker =

- Born: November 20, 1870; Hartsville, South Carolina
- Died: November 28, 1938 (aged 68); Hartsville, South Carolina
- Known for: agricultural reformer

David Robert Coker (November 20, 1870 – November 28, 1938) was an agricultural reformer.

Coker earned a degree from the University of South Carolina in Columbia in 1891. In 1897 he established an experimental farm outside Hartsville. He experimented with breeding sweet corn and cotton. He published his first test results in 1899. He began employing the principles of genetics and systematic methods to improve seed stocks. Between 1902 and 1910, Coker worked to improve cotton varieties with Herbert John Webber to develop a number of improved varieties of cotton. Together, they created one of the first integrated agribusinesses in the southern United States. He also developed new varieties for oats, sorghum, and rye, as well as corn, tobacco, and various fruits and vegetables.

During the 1920s, Coker became a proponent of rural reform, advocating for land reform, crop diversification, better roads and improved education.

Coker also became involved with finance and politics, serving as Mayor of Hartsville from 1902 to 1904, and as director of the Federal Reserve Bank of Richmond.

== Family ==
Coker was the son of Major James Lide Coker, founder of Coker College and Sonoco, Inc. His brother was botanist William Chambers Coker.
