= West Haven Green Historic District =

Historic district in Connecticut, United States

- U.S. National Register of Historic Places
- U.S. Historic district
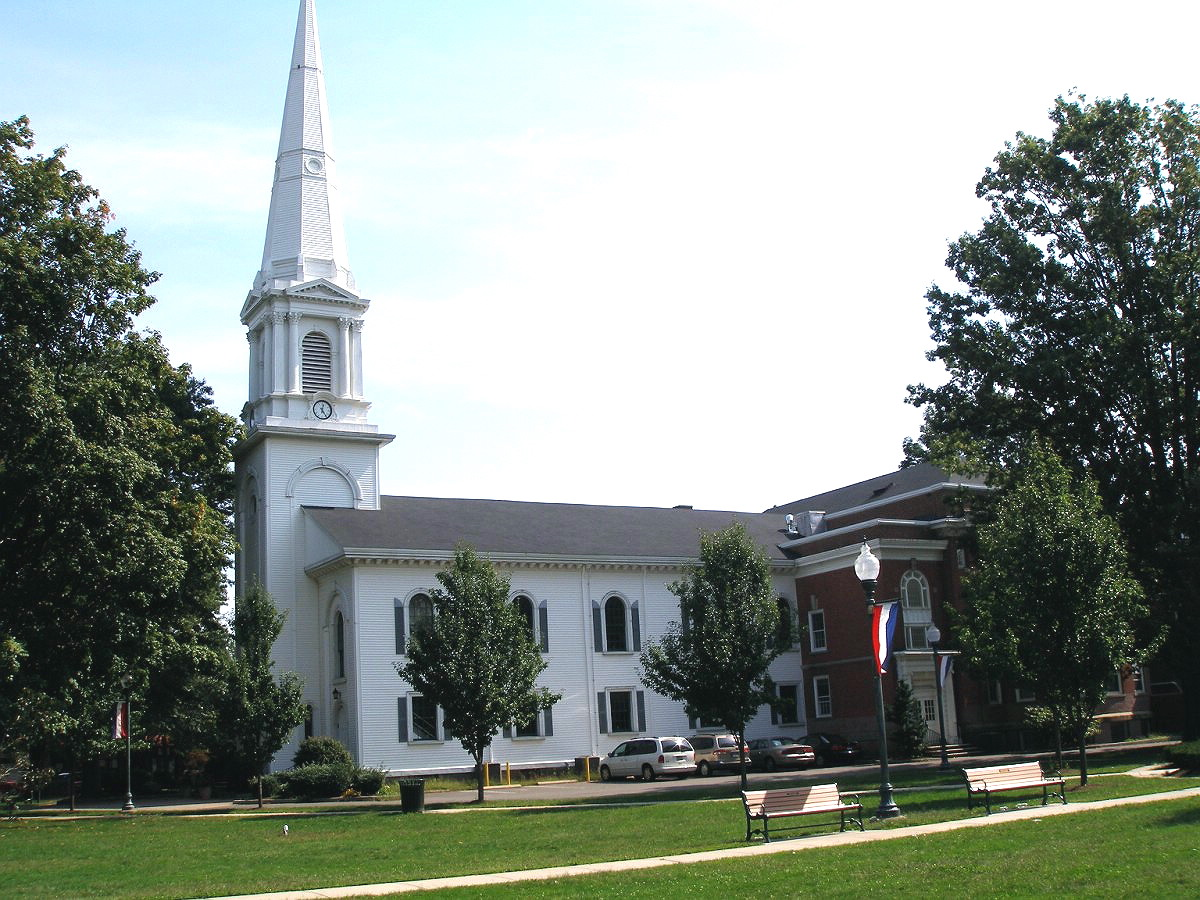
- West Haven Congregational Church

- Location within Connecticut Location within the United States
- Location: Roughly along Main Street, Campbell Street, Church Street, and Savin Street, West Haven, Connecticut
- Coordinates: 41°16′15″N 72°57′1″W
- Architect: Cram, Goodhue & Ferguson; Brown & von Beren, et al.
- Architectural style: Italianate, Queen Anne, et al.
- NRHP reference No.: 00000832
- Added to NRHP: August 11, 2000

West Haven Green is the town green of the New England town of West Haven, Connecticut. The green is bordered by Church Street on the South, Savin Avenue on the West, Main Street on the North and Campbell Avenue on the East. The green and surrounding buildings are part of the West Haven Green Historic District.

There is a sidewalk around the perimeter of the green and paths into the green from the corners and mid-blocks meeting at the center. The dominant structure on the green is the Congregational Church (built 1859). Behind the church is a cemetery. There are also several war memorial markers, a bandstand, and a flagpole around the perimeter of the green. Wooden benches are scattered at various locations on the green. A stone chess table with seating is located near Main Street. At the north end of Main Street is a stone monument to West Haven fire fighters, on top of which is a large bell. Near the east end of Savin Avenue is a large boulder commemorating British Adjutant William Campbell, who saved the life of Reverend Noah Williston during the British invasion (July 5, 1779) of West Haven in the American Revolutionary War. A modern octagonal bandstand is located north of the center of the block of Church Street.

Buildings on Campbell Street (named after William Campbell) are mainly two-story commercial buildings with store fronts on the first floor that were built in the 20th century. One exception is a three-story brick Italianate structure on the corner of Main Street and Campbell Avenue. The Town Hall (built in 1969) is also located at the intersection of Main and Campbell. Savin Avenue consists mainly of early 20th-century single-family homes, one exception being a red-brick funeral home in the Colonial Revival style. On the west corner of Church Street across from the green are two 19th-century wood-frame houses. The rest of the block is taken up by the Christ Episcopal Church and its associated structures and sites.

The West Haven Green Historic District was listed on the National Register of Historic Places on August 11, 2000. In addition to the green itself, the district includes 20 of 23 buildings on and around the green as contributing properties. Two of the memorials on the Green dating from the early 20th century (the World War I memorial and the Firefighters' Monument) are also considered to be contributing properties.

== See also ==
- National Register of Historic Places listings in New Haven County, Connecticut
