= West Haven, Connecticut =

City in Connecticut, United States

- City
- City of West Haven
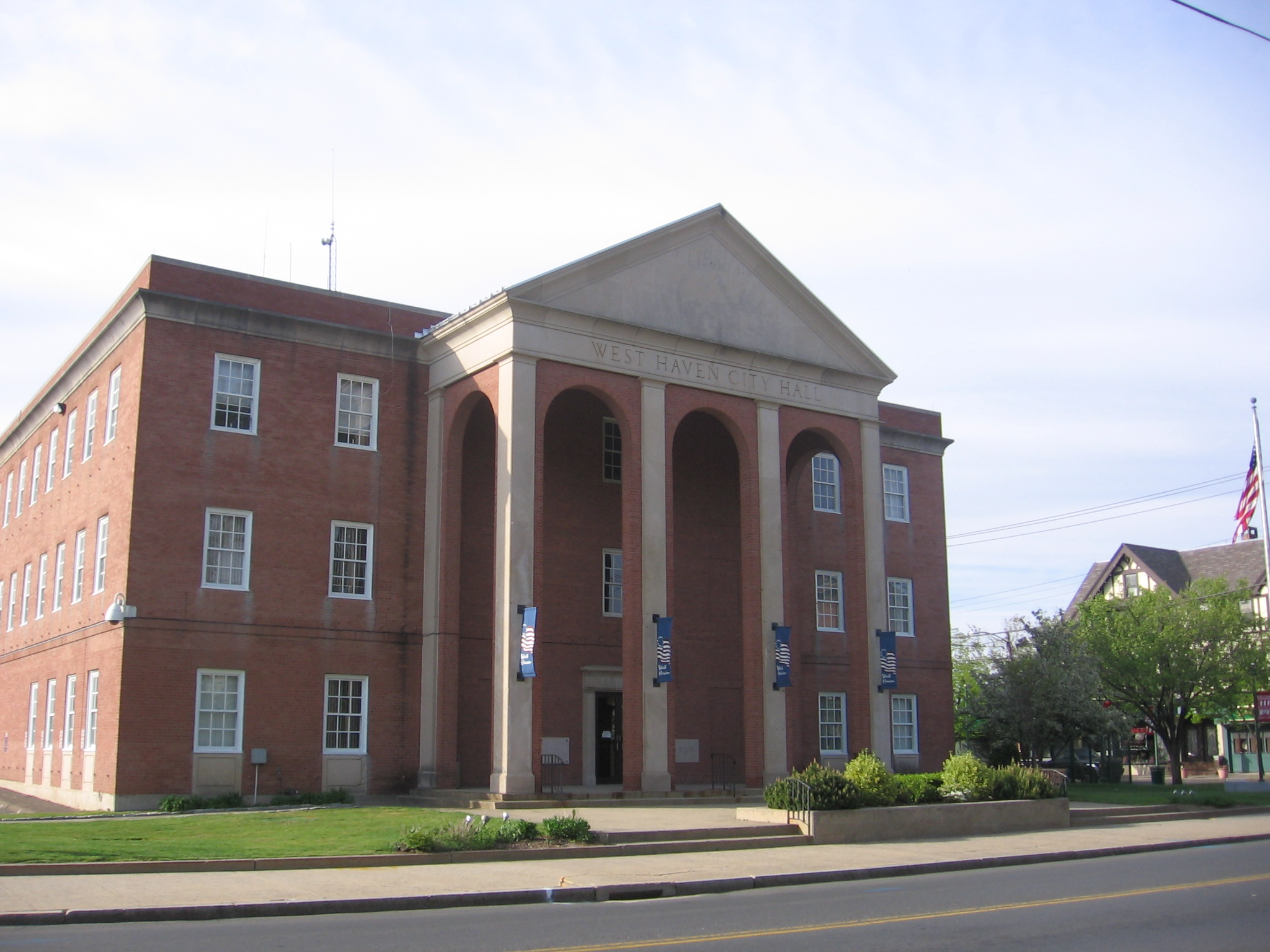
- West Haven City Hall

- Official seal
- Motto: Nil Desperandum (Latin: Do Not Despair)
- Coordinates: 41°16′26″N 72°58′04″W
- Country: United States
- U.S. state: Connecticut
- County: New Haven
- Region: South Central CT
- Incorporated (town): 1921
- Incorporated (city): 1961

Government
  - Type: Mayor-council
  - Mayor: Dorinda Borer

Area
  - Total: 10.92 sq mi (28.27 km^{2})
  - Land: 10.75 sq mi (27.84 km^{2})
  - Water: 0.17 sq mi (0.43 km^{2})
- Elevation: 33 ft (10 m)

Population (2020)
  - Total: 55,584
  - Density: 5,171/sq mi (1,996.6/km^{2})
- Demonym: Westie
- Time zone: UTC−5 (Eastern)
  - Summer (DST): UTC−4 (Eastern)
- ZIP code: 06516
- Area codes: 203/475
- FIPS code: 09-82800
- GNIS feature ID: 0211953
- Website: www.cityofwesthaven.com

West Haven is a city in New Haven County, Connecticut, United States, located on the coast of Long Island Sound. The city is part of the South Central Connecticut Planning Region. At the 2020 census, the population of the city was 55,584.

== History ==
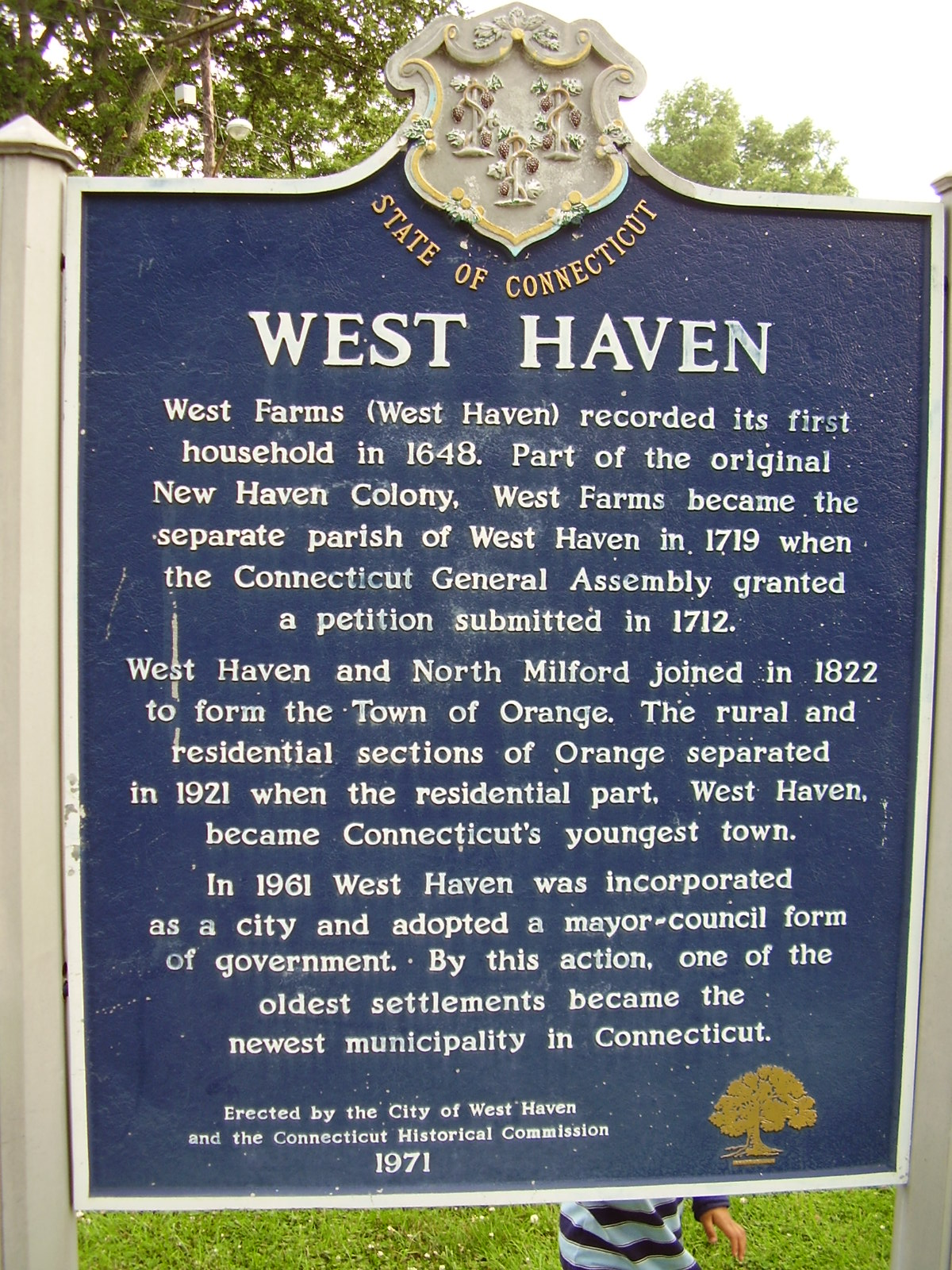
West Haven historical marker

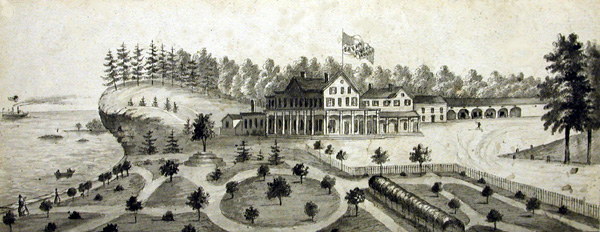
Early image of the grounds at Savin Rock

Settled in 1648, West Haven (then known as West Farms) was a part of the original New Haven Colony. In 1719, it became the separate parish of West Haven, but was still officially a part of New Haven until 1822.

=== Colonial and revolutionary history ===
The Quinnipiac, Pequot, and Mohegan Native American tribes spent summers near the West Haven green and Morse Park, and as far inland as Maltby Lakes. Before New Haven was colonized in 1638 by five hundred settlers following Reverend John Davenport from the Massachusetts Bay Colony, Dutch trader Adriaen Block noted the high mounds of oyster shells along the shoreline while exploring in 1614.

Settled in 1648, West Haven (then known as West Farms) was a part of the original New Haven Colony. The historic crossing of the West River by horse bridge is commemorated in the 1938 mural, "Fording of the West River to Settle West Haven", in the main post office.

Colonists built both a Congregational meeting house and, in the early 18th century, Christ Episcopal Church, one of the first Episcopal churches in New England. The church was started with the help of Yale College and constructed next door to the meeting house. The Congregational meeting house was the site for all town records, government, events, and housed the first public library in the state of Connecticut.

In 1719, the hamlet separated from the Orange parish as West Haven.

During the American Revolution, West Haven was the frequent launch and arrival point for raiding parties on both sides of the war. On July 5, 1779, the British invaded New Haven Harbor and came ashore in West Haven and East Haven. Thomas Painter, a teenaged militiaman watching for the approaching British ships while standing atop Savin Rock, is depicted on the city seal. The main commercial street, Campbell Avenue, is named for British Adjutant William Campbell, at the time an ensign in the Third Guards, who rescued the Reverend Noah Williston, the local Congregational minister and outspoken revolutionary, from being bayoneted by British and Hessian troopers, after he broke his leg trying to escape his captors. Campbell then ordered the soldiers to help the minister back to the parsonage and had the regimental surgeon set his leg. Campbell is also credited with keeping the troops in reasonably good order during their march through the village and reportedly had two soldiers arrested after a local woman accused them of stealing her jewelry. Campbell supposedly said "We make war on soldiers, not civilians". Campbell himself was killed later that day (July 5, 1779) on Allingtown Hill. Campbell is buried in the Allingtown section of town off Prudden Street. Patriot victims of the invasion are buried in the Christ Church and First Society Cemetery. A historical headstone marks Campbell's approximate gravesite and is maintained by the West Haven Historical Society.

=== Early attempts to incorporate ===
While West Haven again attempted to incorporate as its own town in 1784, that attempt failed, primarily due to the protests of neighboring Milford, which opposed North Milford becoming part of the new town. West Haven and North Milford tried again in 1786 and 1787 with the same result. The two finally joined to become Orange (incorporated as a town in 1822). In 1921, West Haven split from Orange to become a separate town. It was incorporated as a city in 1961 and is known as "Connecticut's Youngest City", although it is also one of the state's oldest settlements.

=== Economic history ===
From colonial times until at least World War II, West Haven was heavily involved in shipping. Ships from West Haven sailed to the West Indies and South America for spices, silks, rum, sugar and similar items in return for local timber. More than 35 ship owners, ship builders, masters and captains from West Haven have been identified with that trade. Tall-masted trade ships were built in town by Scandinavian boat builders, and in World War II, pontoon craft and light weight Chris Craft were built in the community.

Industry was also a major part of the local economy, starting with the West Haven and American Buckle Shops, which produced buckles, buttons, clips, and braces during the American Civil War. These factories were later joined by piano and organ companies. During World War II, Armstrong Rubber Company manufactured tires and rafts for the military.

=== Savin Rock Park ===
Savin Rock became a popular vacation spot by the 1870s, when ferries and horse-drawn cars from New Haven created easier access to the site. The New Haven Harbor beachside resort had a playground and carousel.

The Savin Rock section of West Haven was the site of the Savin Rock Amusement Park, which began in the late 19th century as a regionally renowned seaside resort. It evolved into a general amusement park in the 20th century and eventually closed in the 1960s. What followed was a 40-year struggle to stop Savin Rock's Redevelopment—approved by voters in 1963 and officially starting in 1966. It involved multiple referendums, petition drives, court cases, and Connecticut Supreme Court decisions affecting the 40-acre area. Opposition began about 1971 soon after old Savin Rock had been torn down and the first project built, but ballooned in 1973 when Save Our Shore (SOS) led a referendum to stop "the Great Wall of China", an 800-foot, 12-story apartment, proposed for a 10-acre parcel, blocking the shore view. A 1974 referendum to stop all development was organized by IMPACT (successor to SOS), but was overturned by the Supreme Court in 1978. This led to a struggle for a Compromise Plan, initiated by Mayor Robert Johnson, and brought to completion by action of the Concerned Citizens for Bradley Point (1979), which petitioned the final holdout to the Plan, to which the Supreme Court had required all developers to agree for any significant change. The Compromise was signed by all in May 1979, but IMPACT continued to oppose it thru 1980. Thereafter, a committee sought public input and federal money, and in July 1984, the 20-acre Bradley Point Veterans Memorial Park opened. In 1987 and 1989, the city bought development rights of all the remaining parcels, part of which became the Old Grove Park and part included a former restaurant that became the Savin Rock Conference Center. In 1991, the Land Trust of West Haven, Inc. was founded, but it was not until 2007 that a Conservation Easement was signed, preserving all but the Conference Center, as open space forever—beautiful parks, with walks and bike path, along Connecticut's longest public shoreline. Several restaurants remain as last reminders of the area's commercial past; Jimmies of Savin Rock was a restaurant known for its seafood and split hot dogs.

=== Twentieth century ===
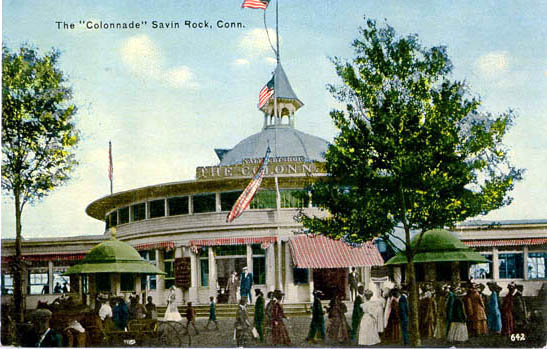
Postcard picture of The Colonnade, Savin Rock

West Haven and North Milford joined to become Orange (incorporated as a town in 1822). In 1921, West Haven split from Orange to become a separate town. It was incorporated as a city in 1961 and is known as "Connecticut's Youngest City."

In 1927, Lender's Beigel Bakery was founded in the city by Polish immigrant Harry Lender. His customers were primarily Jewish delicatessens in New York City. Lender's sons, Murray and Marvin, later ran the business, specializing in "flash-frozen" bagels, a process that allowed the bagels to be sold nationwide. The business had grown to 600 employees by 1984, when it was sold to Kraft Foods.

In 1986, West Haven observed the Bicentennial of the United States Constitution. During the year-long celebrations, the mayor and council passed numerous resolutions to encourage community involvement, including naming the official ship of West Haven—the U.S. Navy destroyer USS Edson (DD-946)—and the city's official flower, the daylily. Public schools included curriculum on the Constitution from K–12, and school children were released from class to participate in a Constitution Day parade up Campbell Avenue.

=== Twenty-first century ===
West Haven has a mayor-City Council form of government. John M. Picard, the city's tenth mayor, was elected in 2005. There are three independent fire districts served by the West Haven, West Shore and Allingtown fire departments.

In June 2014, the "Where Angels Play" playground opened next to Sea Bluff Beach in West Haven. The playground was built in honor of Charlotte Bacon, a victim of the Sandy Hook Elementary School shooting. The playground is pink for Charlotte's favorite color and includes some of her drawings.

West Haven has a mayor-council form of government. Nancy R. Rossi, the city's twelfth mayor, was elected in 2017. She is West Haven's first female mayor. There are two independent fire districts served by the First Fire Taxation (Center) and West Shore. The Allingtown Fire District was relatively recently subsumed by the City who's now responsible for all of its pension-related obligations going forward. Residents expect efforts will be made to consolidate the remaining two fire districts based, in large part, on the recommendation of the State's Municipal Accountability Review Board (MARB) who is currently providing financial support and guidance to the City. As it currently stands, each of the remaining independent Fire Districts levy its own tax rate.

Since 2020, a persistent humming noise has disturbed residents of the West Shore neighborhood, prompting the city to hire an acoustics specialist to investigate.

== On the National Register of Historic Places ==
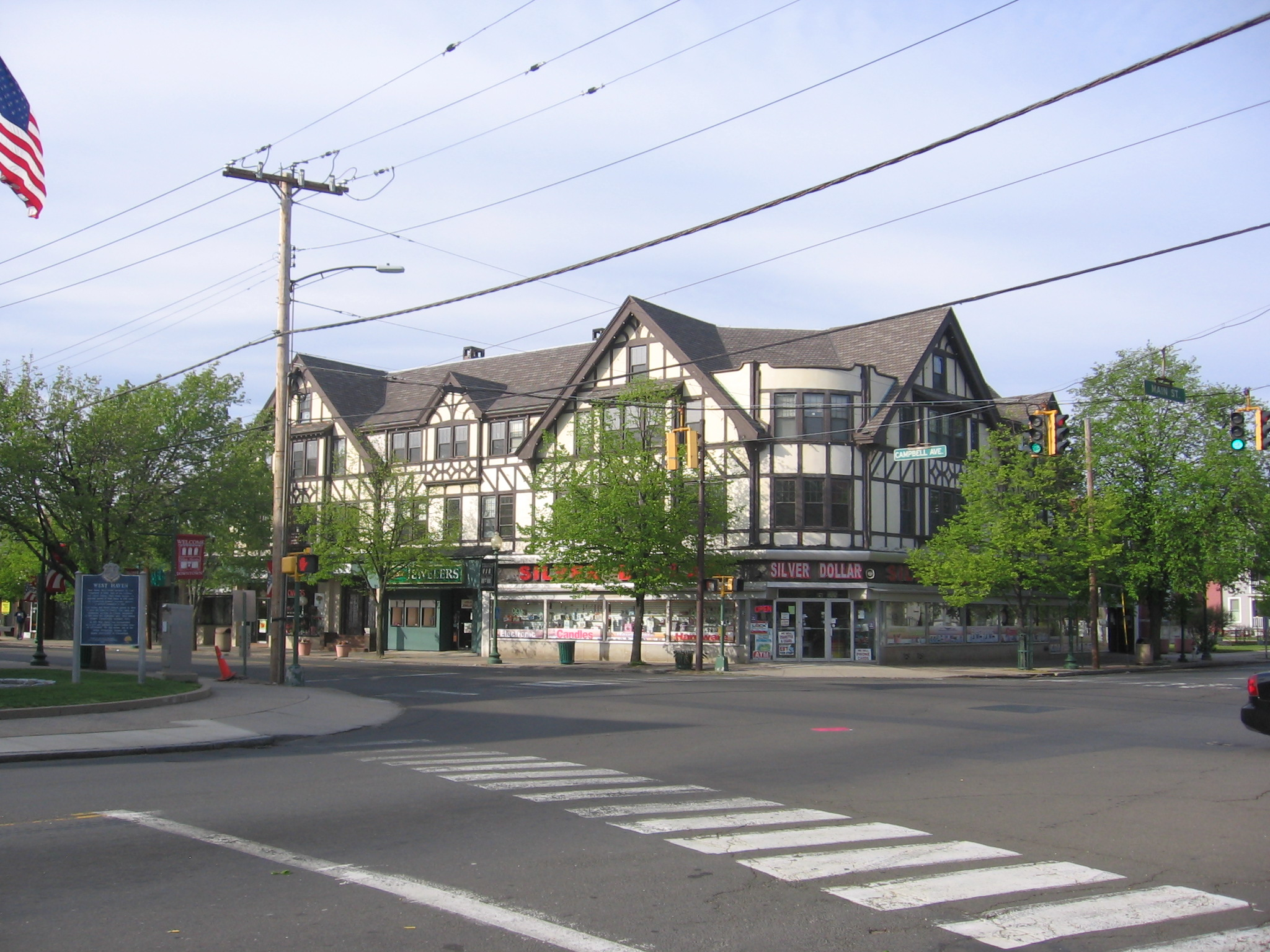
Corner of Main Street and Campbell Avenue

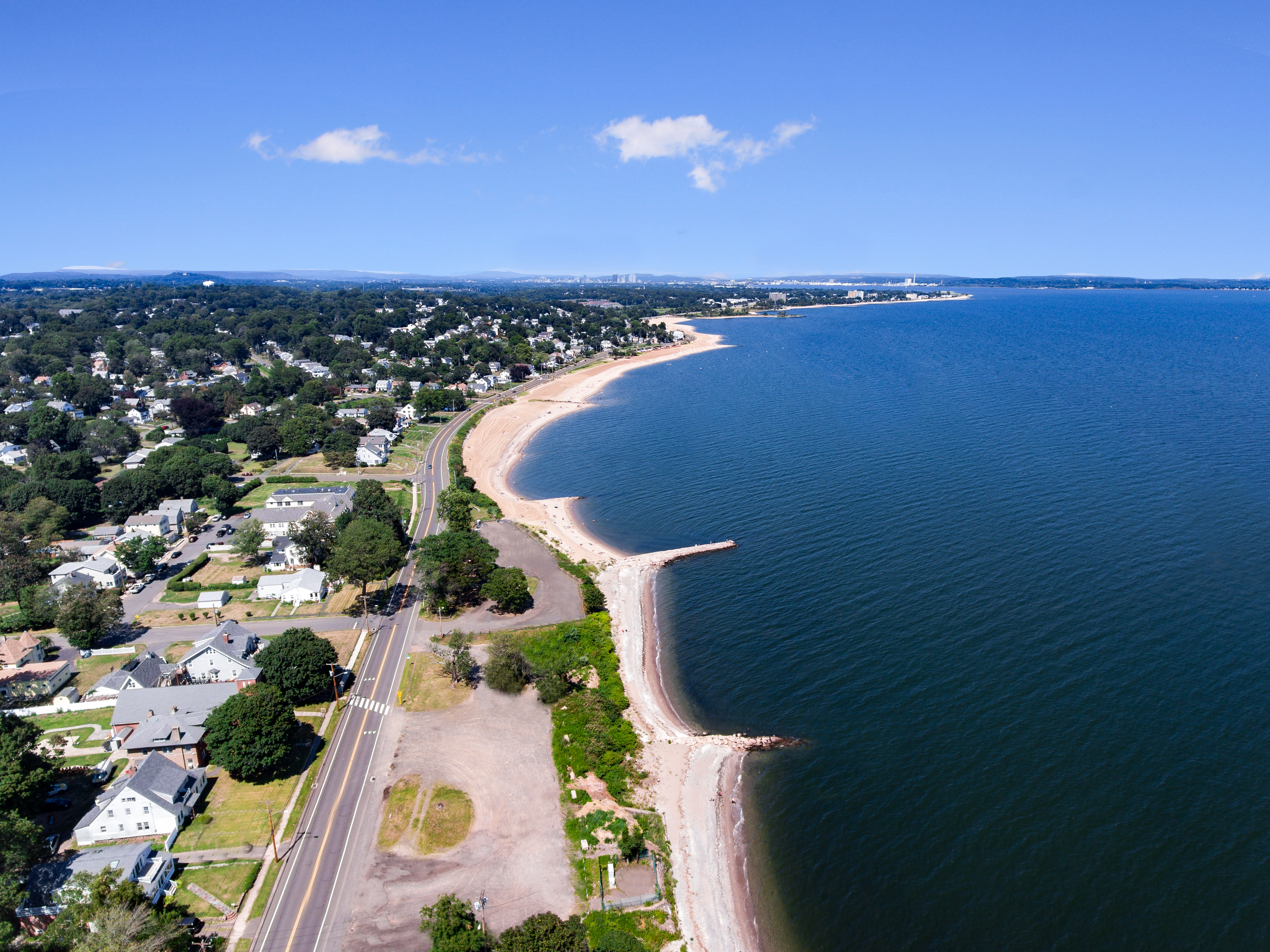
Ocean Ave Aerial with Bradley Point in view, taken near South Street

- American Mills Web Shop, a.k.a.: East Coast Loose Leaf Company, Inc. 114-152 Orange Avenue, West Haven (added to NRHP April 10, 1983)
- Old West Haven High School – 278 Main Street (added November 24, 1985)
- Union School – 174 Center Street (added December 13, 1987)
- Ward-Heitman House – 277 Elm Street (added February 8, 2003)
- West Haven Green Historic District

== Geography ==
According to the U.S. Census Bureau, the city has a total area of 11 square miles (28 km^{2}), of which 10.75 square miles (27.8 km^{2}) is land .2 square miles (0.52 km^{2}), or 1.54%, is water. West Haven has 3.5 miles (5.6 km) of publicly accessible beaches, which is one-quarter of the publicly accessible beaches in Connecticut. The hilly Allingtown district of the city is home to the University of New Haven.

West Haven is located in the south-central portion of Connecticut's 3rd congressional district. The city is bound on the southwest by the Oyster River (the boundary between West Haven and Milford since colonial times), northwest by Orange, north by New Haven and northeast by the West River, which divides West Haven and New Haven. To the east is New Haven Harbor and to the south is Long Island Sound. The Cove River flows through the city.

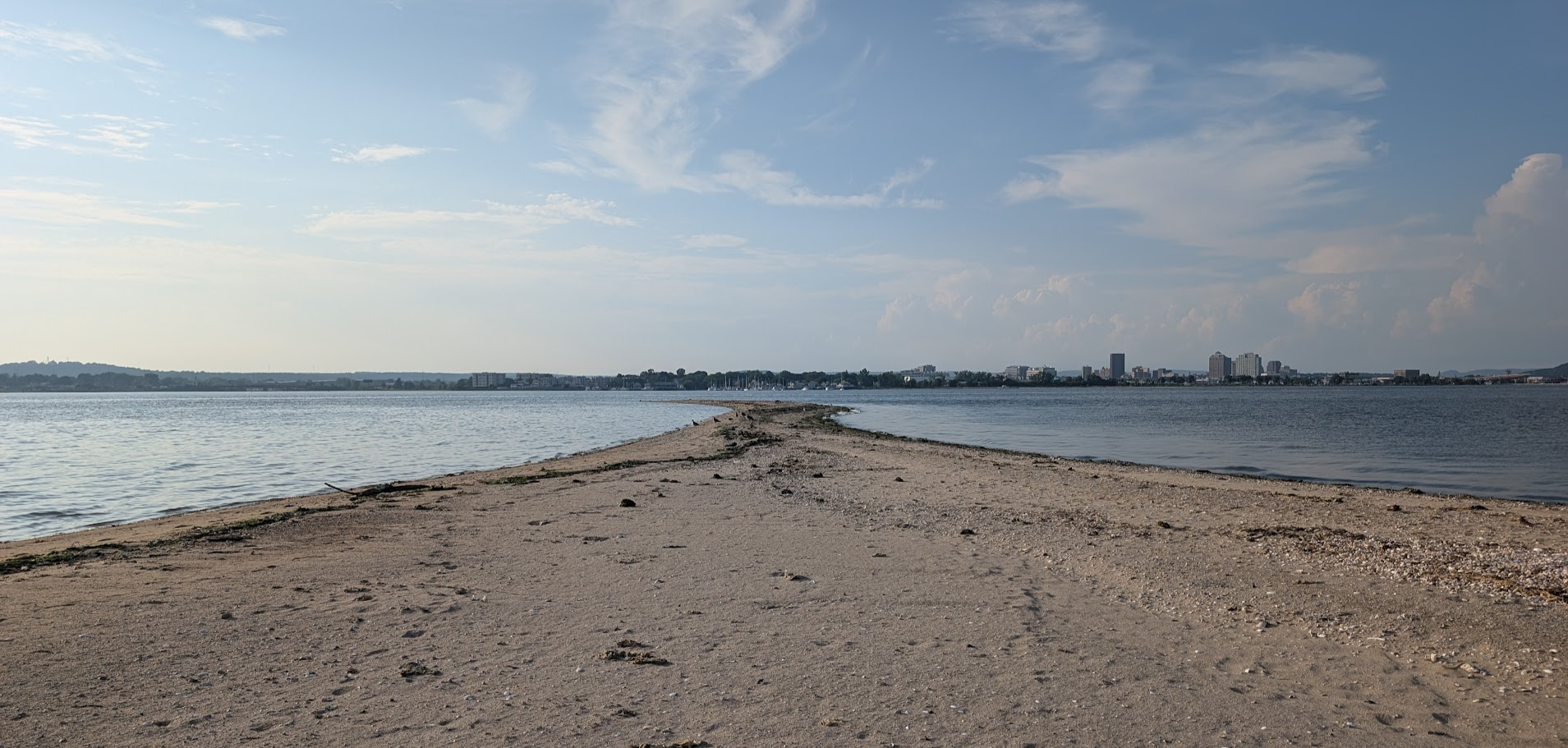
View at Sandy Point, West Haven, CT

At the eastern end, West Haven extends into New Haven Harbor at Sandy Point, a beach and bird sanctuary.

=== Principal communities ===
The three significant neighborhoods in West Haven correspond to the three fire districts. As communities, not all sections of the city fit neatly into these divisions.

- Allingtown
- West Shore
- Center

Additional Neighborhoods:

- Sandy Point

== Demographics ==
Historical population
Census	Pop.	Note	%±
1930	25,808		—
1940	30,021		16.3%
1950	32,010		6.6%
1960	43,002		34.3%
1970	52,851		22.9%
1980	53,184		0.6%
1990	54,021		1.6%
2000	52,360		−3.1%
2010	55,564		6.1%
2020	55,584		0.0%
U.S. Decennial Census

=== 2020 census ===
As of the 2020 census, West Haven had a population of 55,584. The population density was 5,170.2 inhabitants per square mile (1,996.2/km^{2}). The median age was 38.0 years. 18.8% of residents were under the age of 18 and 15.9% of residents were 65 years of age or older. For every 100 females there were 92.6 males, and for every 100 females age 18 and over there were 89.9 males age 18 and over.

100.0% of residents lived in urban areas, while 0.0% lived in rural areas.

There were 21,409 households in West Haven, of which 27.8% had children under the age of 18 living in them. Of all households, 36.0% were married-couple households, 22.3% were households with a male householder and no spouse or partner present, and 34.6% were households with a female householder and no spouse or partner present. About 31.4% of all households were made up of individuals and 12.1% had someone living alone who was 65 years of age or older.

There were 22,735 housing units, of which 5.8% were vacant. The homeowner vacancy rate was 1.1% and the rental vacancy rate was 5.4%.

Racial composition as of the 2020 census
Race	Number	Percent
White	28,277	50.9%
Black or African American	12,173	21.9%
American Indian and Alaska Native	364	0.7%
Asian	2,709	4.9%
Native Hawaiian and Other Pacific Islander	13	0.0%
Some other race	6,323	11.4%
Two or more races	5,725	10.3%
Hispanic or Latino (of any race)	13,177	23.7%

=== Income ===
The median income for a household in the city in 2020 was $73,566 in 2020 dollars. Families had a median income of $91,336, married couples had a median income of $115,259, and nonfamily households had a median income of $47,666. About 12.5% of the population were below the poverty line, including 14.6% of those under age 18 and 9.6% of those age 65 or over.

== Economy ==
West Haven was a shipping and industrial center, known for its buckle shops and later Armstrong Rubber Co. Coleco (originally Connecticut Leather Company- later the toy & video game manufacturer), and Sikorsky Aircraft, a division of United Technologies, also had operations in West Haven.

Bayer Pharmaceuticals North America, a branch of Bayer AG, based in Leverkusen, North Rhine-Westphalia, Germany, had a plant in West Haven, but the company announced in 2006 that it was shutting its operations in the city, affecting about 1,000 workers. The 137-acre (0.55 km^{2}) former Bayer campus comprises 17 buildings, mostly in West Haven but partly in Orange. In 2007, Yale University purchased the entire campus for biotechnology, pharmaceutical and other life sciences research.

== Education ==
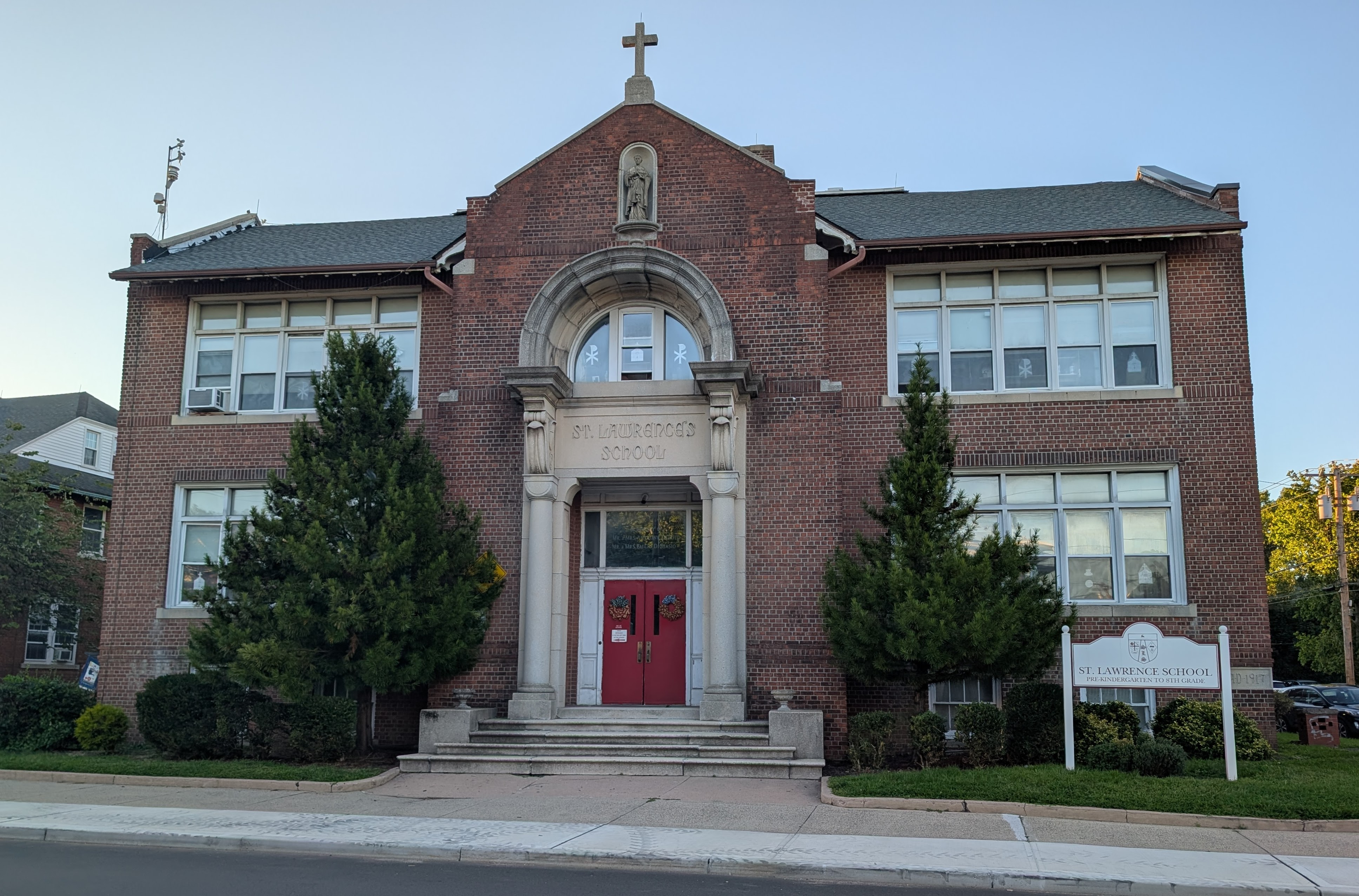
St. Lawrence School

West Haven is home to one public high school, a middle school, intermediate school, and six elementary schools. There are also three private schools, Notre Dame West Haven, St. Lawrence School, and Our Lady of Victory School.

West Haven is home to the University of New Haven and a U.S. Veterans Affairs hospital.

The Yale University athletic fields extend into West Haven. Yale Field, Yale's baseball park and formerly a minor league baseball park, is in West Haven. The Yale Bowl is in New Haven, near the West Haven border. Yale's West Campus is also primarily in West Haven at the border with Orange.

== Transportation ==
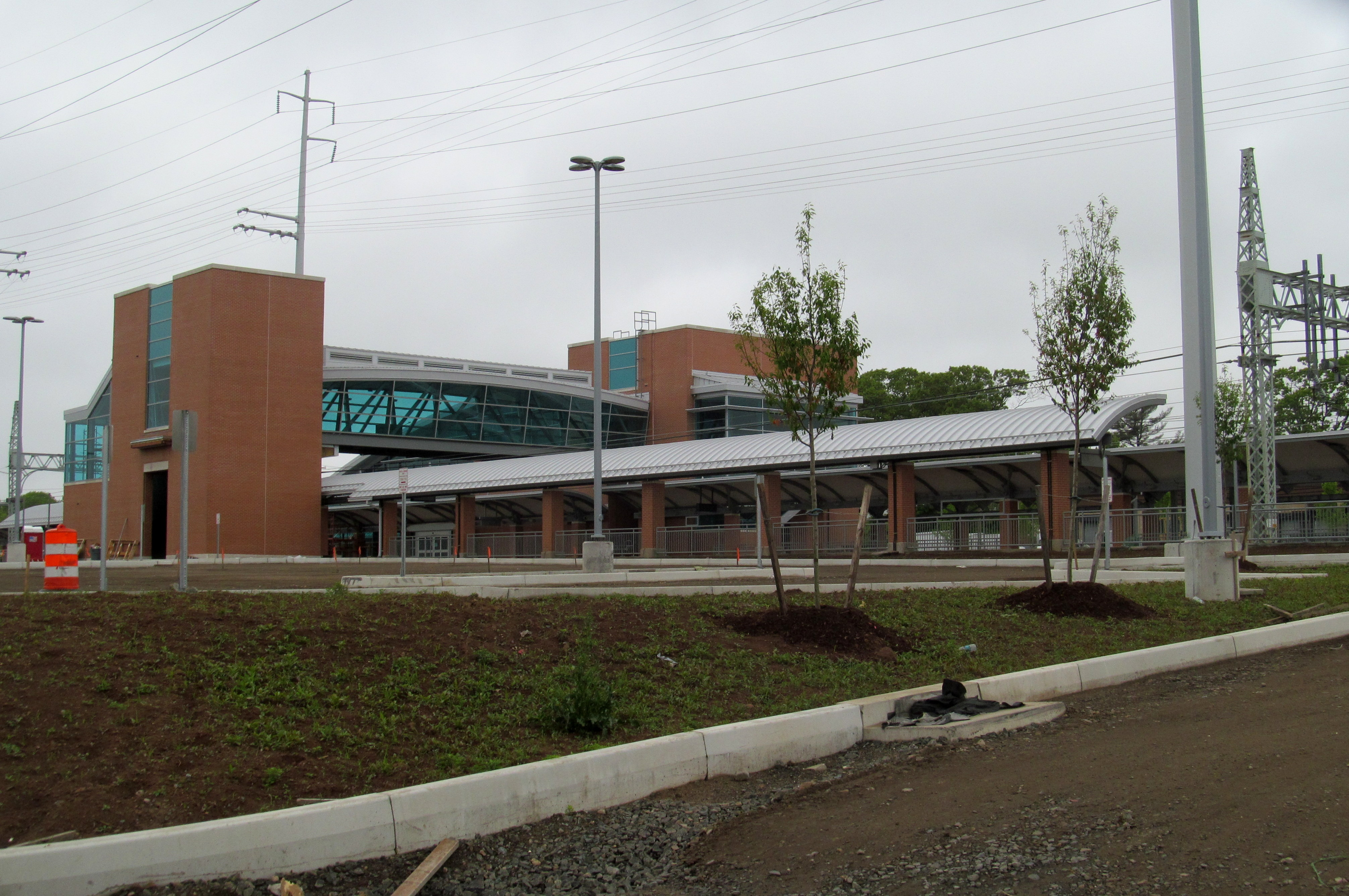
West Haven station

Interstate 95 (I-95), Route 34 (also known as Derby Avenue), and U.S. Route 1 (US 1, the Boston Post Road) run through West Haven, between Orange and New Haven. Route 162, which both begins and ends at US 1, starts in Orange, passes through West Haven, and ends in Milford. A north-south state road, Route 122, begins in New Haven, comprising Forest Road, a stretch of Campbell Avenue and First Avenue up to the junction with I-95.

Bus service is provided by Connecticut Transit New Haven. West Haven Center is served by the various 265 and 271 routes (main service along Campbell Avenue). The 265B service continues to Saw Mill Road and Bull Hill Lane; the 265R service run along Jones Hill Road and terminate at the Baybrook Shopping Center near Oyster River; the 265S service continues to Savin Rock via Second Avenue. The Route 271M/S routes run along the West Haven shore towards Milford. The Route 261 route serves the areas along Orange Avenue. The 268 route serves the Veterans Affairs Hospital (C) and Bull Hill Lane (B).

A rail line, used by Metro-North Railroad and Amtrak, runs through West Haven. In 2013, the Connecticut Department of Transportation opened a new Metro-North station in West Haven, across from the former Armstrong factory. West Haven station provides commuter rail service on the Metro-North Railroad's New Haven Line. The station provides full service on Metro-North into New York City, and has 660 parking spaces on-site. Amtrak does not stop in West Haven; the closest Amtrak stop is New Haven's Union Station.

Tweed New Haven Regional Airport, in New Haven, is the closest facility offering air service to West Haven.

== Notable people ==
- Marian Bergeron, Miss America 1933, youngest holder and only woman from New England to win that pageant's crown title
- Ulish Booker, NFL football player
- Dorinda Keenan Borer, member of the Connecticut House of Representatives
- Art Ceccarelli (1930–2012), Major League Baseball pitcher
- Melanie Chartoff, actress
- Eleanor Estes (1906–1988), author of children's literature
- Douglas Ford (born Fortunato; born 1922), professional golfer
- William L. Hadden, Lieutenant Governor of Connecticut from 1943–1945 and Attorney General from 1945–1951
- Kevin Heffernan, actor, writer, producer, director, and comedian
- Ruth Rosekrans Hoffman (1926–2007) artist and children's book illustrator
- Rob Jackson, former NFL football player
- Jamey Jasta, metalcore musician
- Judy Pancoast, children's music singer and songwriter
- George R. Johnson (1929–1973), Pennsylvania State Representative.
- Samuel Johnson (1696–1772), clergyman and the first president of the Anglican King's College (later Columbia University)
- Tommy Nelson, actor
- Rufus Porter (1792–1884), painter, inventor, founder of Scientific American
- Jon Schnepp, film writer-director
- Pfc. William A. Soderman (1912–1980), Medal of Honor from World War II
- Tony Sparano (1961–2018), NFL coach
- Jonathan D. Spence, author and professor of history at Yale University
- Ken Strong, NFL football player, inducted into the Pro Football Hall of Fame in 1967
- Donald Thomas, professional football player
- Smoky Joe Wood (1889–1985), Major League Baseball pitcher
