= Davidson Hall, Coker University =

Historic building in South Carolina, US

- U.S. National Register of Historic Places
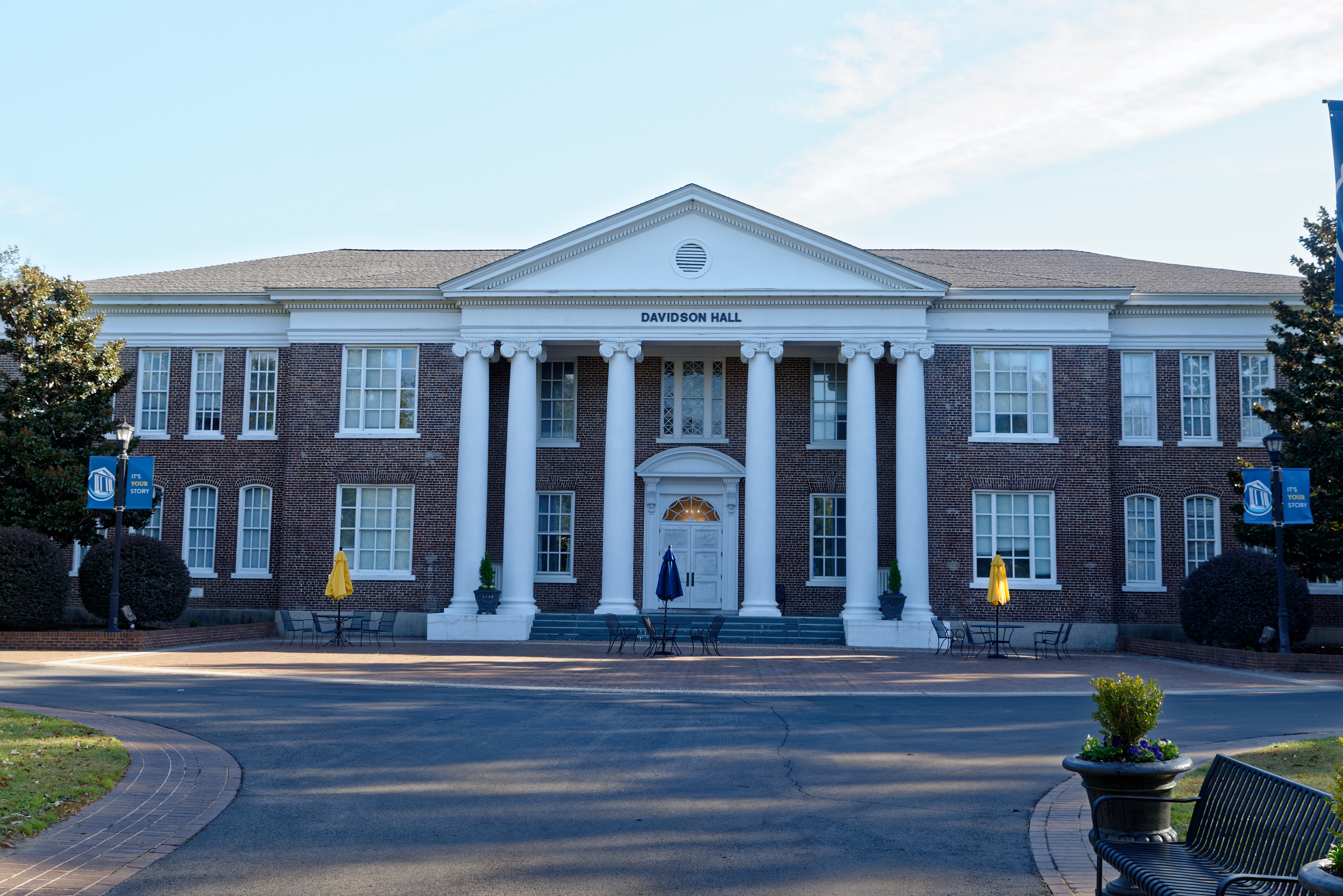

- Location within South Carolina Location within the United States
- Location: College Ave., Hartsville, South Carolina
- Coordinates: 34°22′39″N 80°04′05″W
- Area: less than one acre
- Built: 1909-1910
- Architect: Wilson, Sompayrac, & Urquhart
- Architectural style: Classical Revival
- NRHP reference No.: 83003835
- Added to NRHP: November 10, 1983

Davidson Hall, Coker University, also known as the Administration Building, is a historic educational building located on the campus of Coker University at Hartsville, Darlington County, South Carolina. It was built in 1909–1910, and is a two-story, 15-bay, rectangular brick building with Neo-Classical details. It has a hip roof and a projecting semicircular auditorium on the rear elevation. The front façade features a projecting, two-story, pedimented portico, supported by six stuccoed Ionic order columns. It was built with funds donated by the college's founder, Major James Lide Coker, and was the first building constructed for Coker University.

It was listed on the National Register of Historic Places in 1983.
