= Memorial Hall, Coker University =

- Memorial Hall
- U.S. National Register of Historic Places
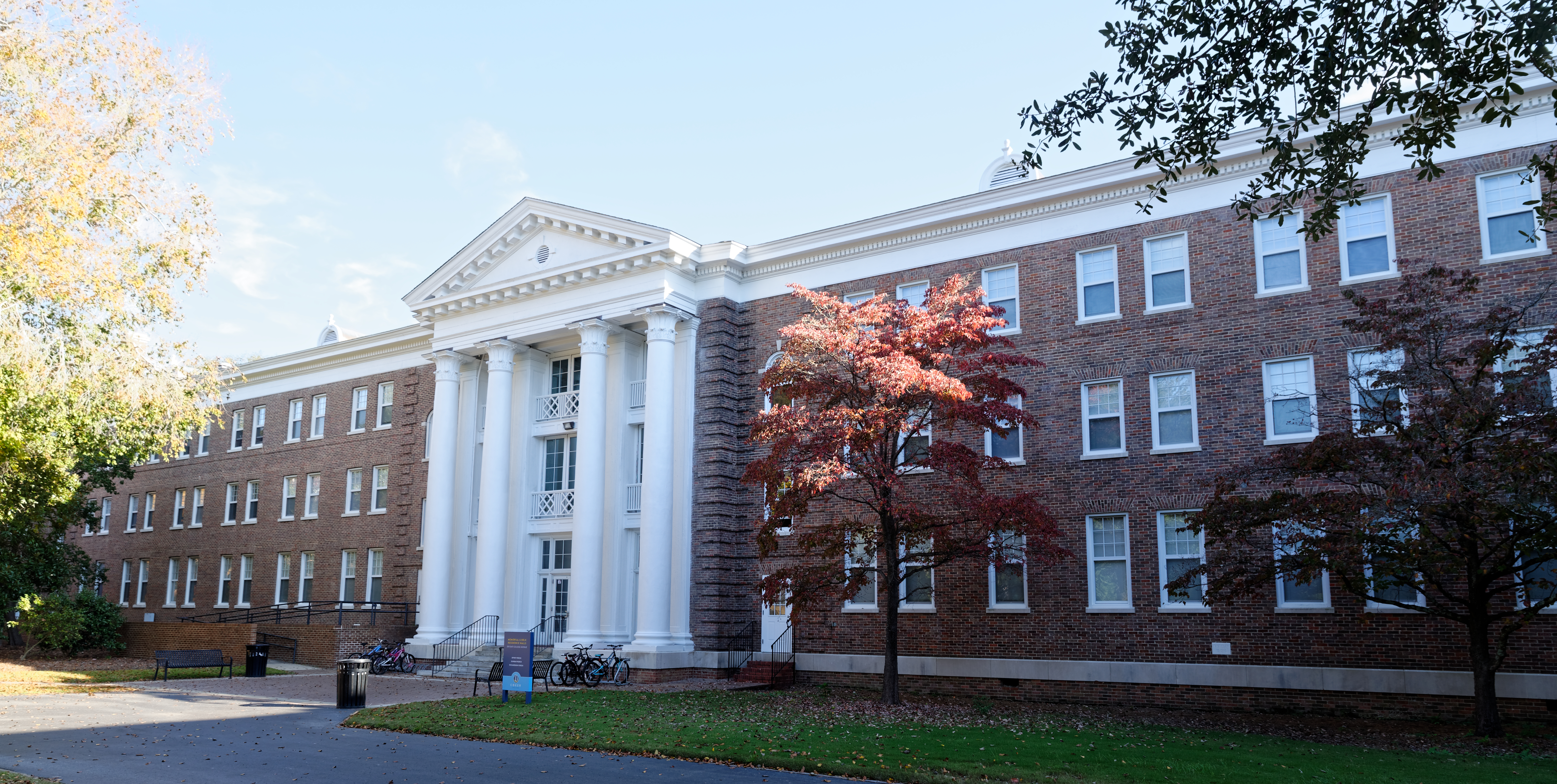

- Location within South Carolina Location within the United States
- Location: 2nd St. between Home Ave. and Carolina Ave., Hartsville, South Carolina
- Coordinates: 34°22′42″N 80°4′1″W
- Area: 1.6 acres (0.65 ha)
- Built: 1913, 1916
- Architect: Wilson & Sompayrac
- Architectural style: Classical Revival
- NRHP reference No.: 89000001
- Added to NRHP: February 9, 1989

Memorial Hall, also known as the General Service Building, is a historic dormitory building located on the campus of Coker University at Hartsville, Darlington County, South Carolina. It was built in two phases in 1913 and 1916. Memorial Hall is a three-story, five-bay, masonry building with Neo-Classical details. The front façade features a three-bay projecting full-height portico supported by four colossal Corinthian order columns. In 1916, the General Service Building was added and consists of three distinct parts: a central projecting block and two dormitory wings. It was built with funds donated by the college's founder, Major James Lide Coker.

It was listed on the National Register of Historic Places in 1989.
