= American Mills Web Shop =

- U.S. National Register of Historic Places
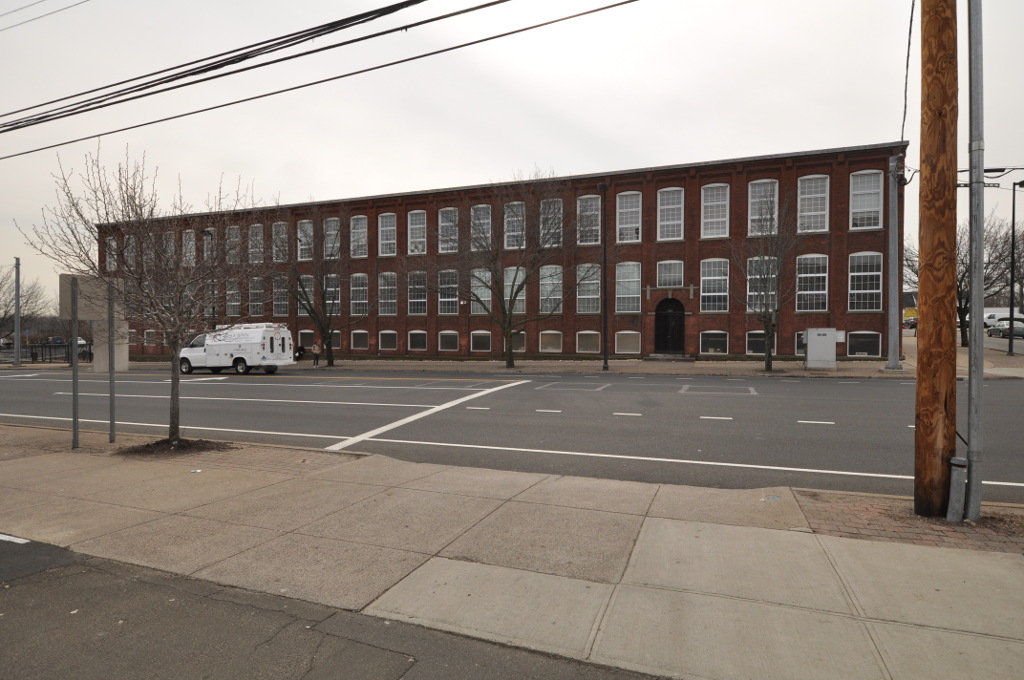

- Location within Connecticut Location within the United States
- Location: 114-152 Orange Avenue, West Haven, Connecticut
- Coordinates: 41°17′44″N 72°57′20″W
- Area: 4.9 acres (2.0 ha)
- Built: 1903
- Architectural style: Italianate
- NRHP reference No.: 83001276
- Added to NRHP: March 10, 1983

The American Mills Web Shop is a historic industrial complex at 114-152 Orange Avenue U.S. Route 1 in West Haven, Connecticut. Developed between 1903 and 1914, it is an example of industrial development of the period. The complex was listed on the National Register of Historic Places in 1983.

== Description and history ==
The American Mills Web Shop is located in West Haven's northeastern Allingtown section, extending east and south at the Junction of Front Street and Orange Avenue (U.S. Route 1). The principal elements of the complex are a large weave shed, a single story structure extending along Front Street, and the administrative building, which faces Orange Avenue and is two stories in height. A smokestack and boiler room are located behind these buildings; a more extensive set of outbuildings once also occupied the roughly 5-acre (2.0 ha) parcel, but have been demolished. The weave shed has a particularly well-preserved sawtooth roof, a period innovation that brought daylight to the interiors of large industrial spaces.

The complex was begun in 1903 by the Narrow Fabrics Company, which specialized in manufacturing elastic fabrics used in applications such as industrial machine belts, zipper backings, brake linings, and automotive safety belts. The company grew rapidly, enlarging the plant substantially in 1909 and 1914. In 1914, a series of corporate mergers was accompanied by a name change to the American Mills Web Company. It remained in operation until 1970, and underwent rehabilitation for other uses in the early 1980s.

== See also ==
- National Register of Historic Places listings in New Haven County, Connecticut
