= Harvey Hilbert =

American army veteran and psychotherapist (born 1947)

Harvey Daiho Hilbert
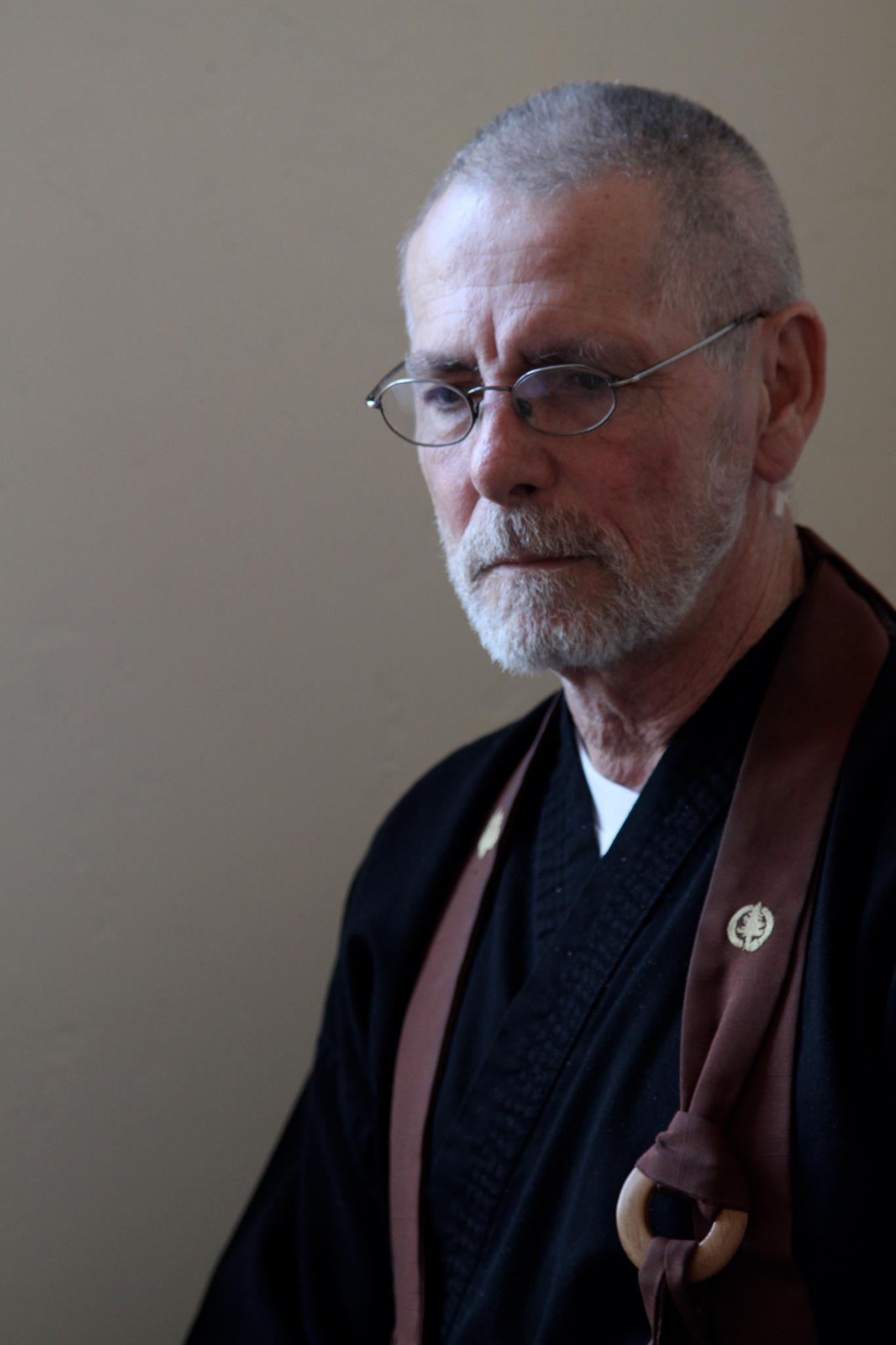
- Dr. Harvey Daiho Hilbert Roshi
- Title: Priest

Personal life
- Spouse: Rev. Kathryn Shukke Hilbert
- Education: Case Western Reserve University

Religious life
- Religion: Zen Buddhism
- School: Sōtō

Senior posting
- Teacher: Ken Hogaku Shozen McGuire roshi

Harvey Daiho Hilbert Roshi (born 1947) is an American psychotherapist and expert on post-Vietnam stress syndrome. He is an ordained Soto Zen priest and the founding abbot of the Order of Clear Mind Zen and a leader of the Zen community in southern New Mexico. He was featured in a documentary on Vietnam Veterans that aired on both National Public Radio's "Morning Edition" and PBS station KRWG-TV. During combat in the Vietnam War Hilbert was shot in the head, leaving him paralyzed on the left side of his body. Despite his injuries, Hilbert went on to college.

== Early life and education ==
Hilbert was born in New Jersey in 1947 and grew up in Florida. A high school drop out, he enlisted in the Army in 1964 at age 17. In 1966, he was assigned to Company A, 35th Infantry Division, 3rd Brigade Task Force in Vietnam. On May 29, 1966, his company was taken by helicopter to an ongoing battle at LZ 10 Alpha near Pleiku Province, Vietnam as part of Operation Paul Revere. During the fighting Hilbert was shot in the head, resulting in an 8-square-inch hole in his skull. He also was hit in the back with shrapnel. Due to combat, he could not be airlifted out until the following morning.

Hilbert was taken to a field hospital, where bullet fragments were removed from his brain. The wounds left him paralyzed on his left side. After rehabilitation, he recovered the use of most of his leg and some functioning of his arm.

He obtained his bachelor's degree (multidisciplinary) from Coker College, and then attended Case Western Reserve University to study social work, obtaining both his master's and PhD. Hilbert is also an artist. After his release from the Army, Hilbert dedicated himself to working with those suffering from combat-related post-traumatic stress disorder, or PTSD.

== Military awards ==
On September 27, 1966, Hilbert's unit received the Presidential Unit Citation.

Also for his service, Hilbert was awarded a Purple Heart and the National Defense Service Medal.

== Trauma victim work ==
After college, Hilbert began a private practice focused on helping trauma survivors, which continued for nearly three decades. A key component of his treatment was the use of contemplative practices with his clients. In addition to his private practice he also served as a consultant to other PTSD treatment facilities.

Eventually his business grew into the Proact Corporation, a canopy organization, which consisted of Rainbeau Research and Counseling Centers, Professional Guidance Institute, Employee Assistance Program, and Stress Intervention Centers. The companies served patients from seven offices in two states.

Hilbert twice testified before the U.S. Congress as an expert witness on those suffering from PTSD.

== Zen ==
At 19, he began meditating and studying Zen. and eventually became a student of Ken Hogaku Shozen McGuire roshi at the Dharma Mountain Zendo in Cloudcroft, New Mexico. In 2005, he was given Dharma Transmission.

In 2005, he retired from clinical practice to establish the Order of Clear Mind Zen in Las Cruces, New Mexico, with affiliates in northern California, Virginia, and West Texas. Hilbert has a history of street practice, bearing witness for peace, and continues his community service with vulnerable populations.

== Books and studies ==
Hilbert contributed to several books and studies, including Social Work Today, Volume 16. He co-authored Homelessness in Ohio: A Study of People in Need, Franklin County Report, which was published by the Ohio Department of Mental Health. He wrote the book Zen in your Pocket about Zen helping with traumatic stress and disability. Roshi Hilbert also wrote Living Zen: The Diary of an American Zen Priest, which details a year in the life of a Zen priest, and what he learned about life from the day-to-day events.

Other writings include:

- Goldstein, Howard; Harvey C. Hilbert (1984). Creative Change: A Cognitive-Humanistic Approach to Social Work Practice. New York, NY: Tavistock Publications. ISBN 978-0-422-78650-8.
- Hilbert, Harvey (1982). Child Abuse Teacher Inservice Training : A Cooperative Venture. Distributed by ERIC Clearinghouse.
- Hilbert, Harvey; Hilbert, H.C. (1984). "Battered women leaving shelter: Which way do they go? A discriminant function analysis". Journal of Applied Social Science. 8: 291–297.

== Personal life ==
Hilbert lives in Las Cruces, New Mexico with his wife the Rev. Kathryn Shukke Hilbert.

== See also ==
- Buddhism in the United States
- Timeline of Zen Buddhism in the United States
