= Ulish Booker =

American gridiron football player (born 1979)

Profile
- Position: Offensive tackle

Personal information
- Born: August 14, 1979 (age 47); West Haven, Connecticut, U.S.
- Listed height: 6 ft 6 in (1.98 m)
- Listed weight: 319 lb (145 kg)

Career information
- High school: West Haven (CT)
- College: Michigan State
- NFL draft: 2003: undrafted

Career history
- Atlanta Falcons (2003)*; Pittsburgh Steelers (2005–2006); → Amsterdam Admirals (2005); Toronto Argonauts (2008)
- * Offseason or practice squad member only

Awards and highlights
- Super Bowl champion (XL)

Ulish Booker (August 14, 1979) is an American former professional football offensive tackle.

Booker began his football career in West Haven, Connecticut, playing for West Haven High School where he made the All-State team. He went on to play college football for Michigan State University, and he was signed as an undrafted free agent by the Atlanta Falcons. The Falcons cut Booker in 2003 before he played a single down in the NFL.

Booker would, however, eventually make his way back into the NFL on February 1, 2005, when he was signed by the Pittsburgh Steelers and allocated to NFL Europe where he played for the Amsterdam Admirals.

He went on to become a starter with the Amsterdam Admirals, winning offensive MVP honors, and claiming victory in 2005 NFL Europe World Bowl XIII.

That same season, Booker returned to the Pittsburgh Steelers as a member of the team that won Super Bowl XL.

He added his name to a list of only five players to win World Bowl and Super Bowl rings in the same season.

On August 28, 2006, the Steelers placed Booker on the injured reserve list with a torn ACL.

Prior to playing in the NFL, the 6'7" and over 300-pound Booker was a substitute teacher in West Haven, Connecticut.

On April 1, 2008, Booker signed with the Toronto Argonauts of the Canadian Football League.

Booker recently started First Foot Forward Family Solutions, a mentoring agency specializing in youth and families.

He currently resides in New Haven, Connecticut

He now coaches at St. Luke's School in New Canaan, Connecticut as the offensive line coach for the Storm.
