= Natalie Harder =

American academic administrator

17th President of Coker University
- Incumbent
- Assumed office June 1, 2020
- Preceded by: Robert L. Wyatt

Personal details
- Education: University at Buffalo; Carnegie Mellon University; Old Dominion University

Natalie Harder is an American academic administrator serving as the 17th president of Coker University since 2020.

== Life ==
Harder is from Buffalo, New York. She earned a bachelor's degree in economics from the University at Buffalo. She completed a master's degree in finance from Carnegie Mellon University. Harder received a Ph.D. in community college leadership from Old Dominion University.

Harder was the executive director of the Erie Community College Foundation and the vice president of institutional advancement at Patrick & Henry Community College. From 2012 to May 29, 2020, she was the chancellor of South Louisiana Community College. In this role, she led the merger of the community and technical colleges to streamline operations and costs. During her tenure, enrollment increased from 6,100 students to over 18,000. On June 1, 2020, she became the 17th president of Coker University. She is the first female in the role. In 2024, her contract was extended through 2030.
