= Cove River =

River in Connecticut, US

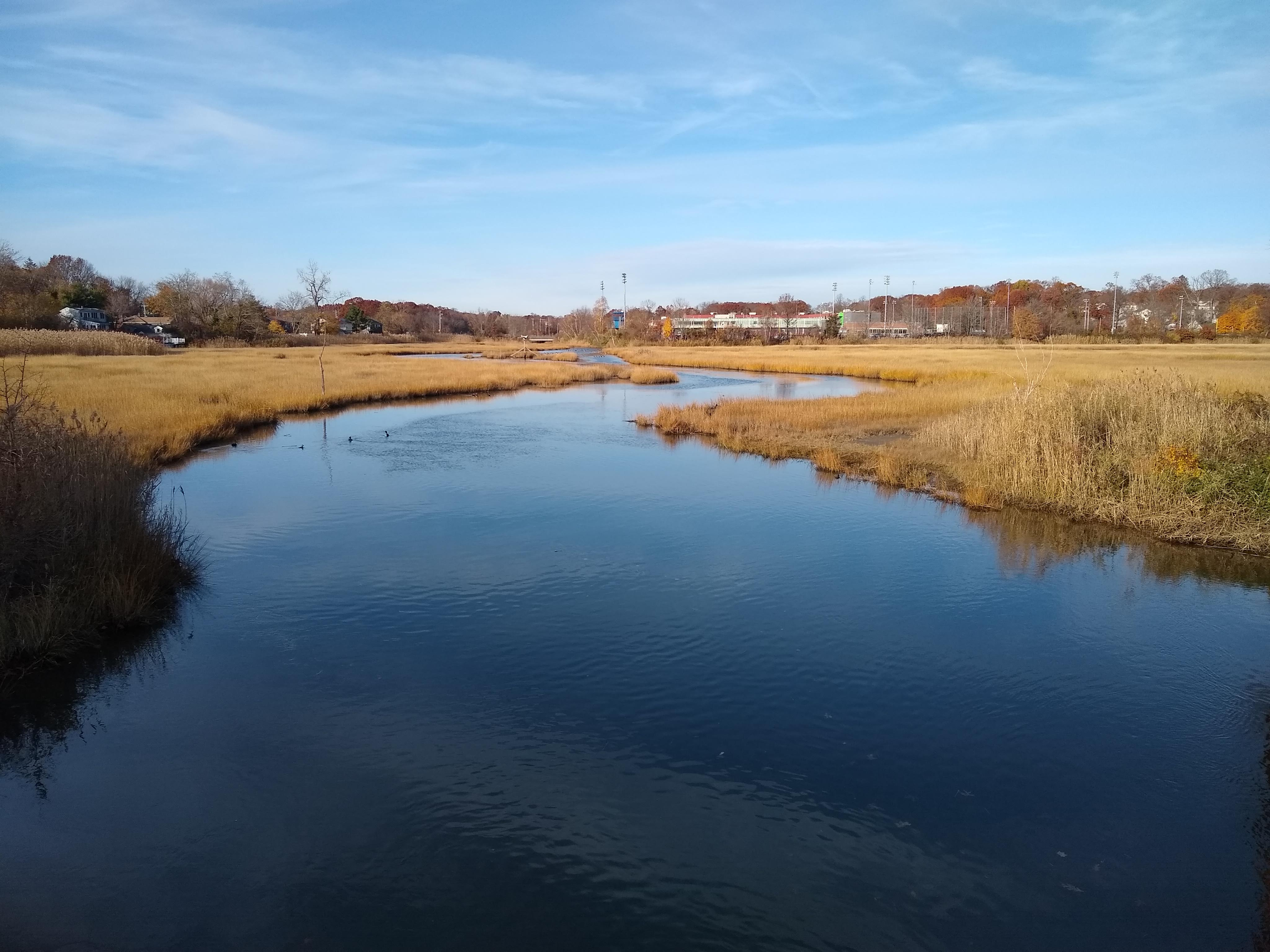
- Cove River in West Haven, Connecticut.

Location
- Country: United States
- State: Connecticut
- County: New Haven

Physical characteristics
- Source: Orange, Connecticut
- Mouth: Long Island Sound
  - location: West Haven, Connecticut
  - coordinates: 41°15′09″N 72°57′35″W

The Cove River is a stream in New Haven County in the U.S. state of Connecticut. It rises in Orange and flows through West Haven before discharging into Long Island Sound at Sea Bluff Beach by Bradley Point. Dams along the river form the Maltby Lakes, reservoirs of the South Central Connecticut Regional Water Authority, as well as Phipps Lake. A project was initiated in 2021 to replace the flood gates near the mouth to regulate water flow into the salt march upstream. This project also includes a new aluminum truss pedestrian bridge at the mouth to connect Bradley Point Park and Sea Bluff Beach.

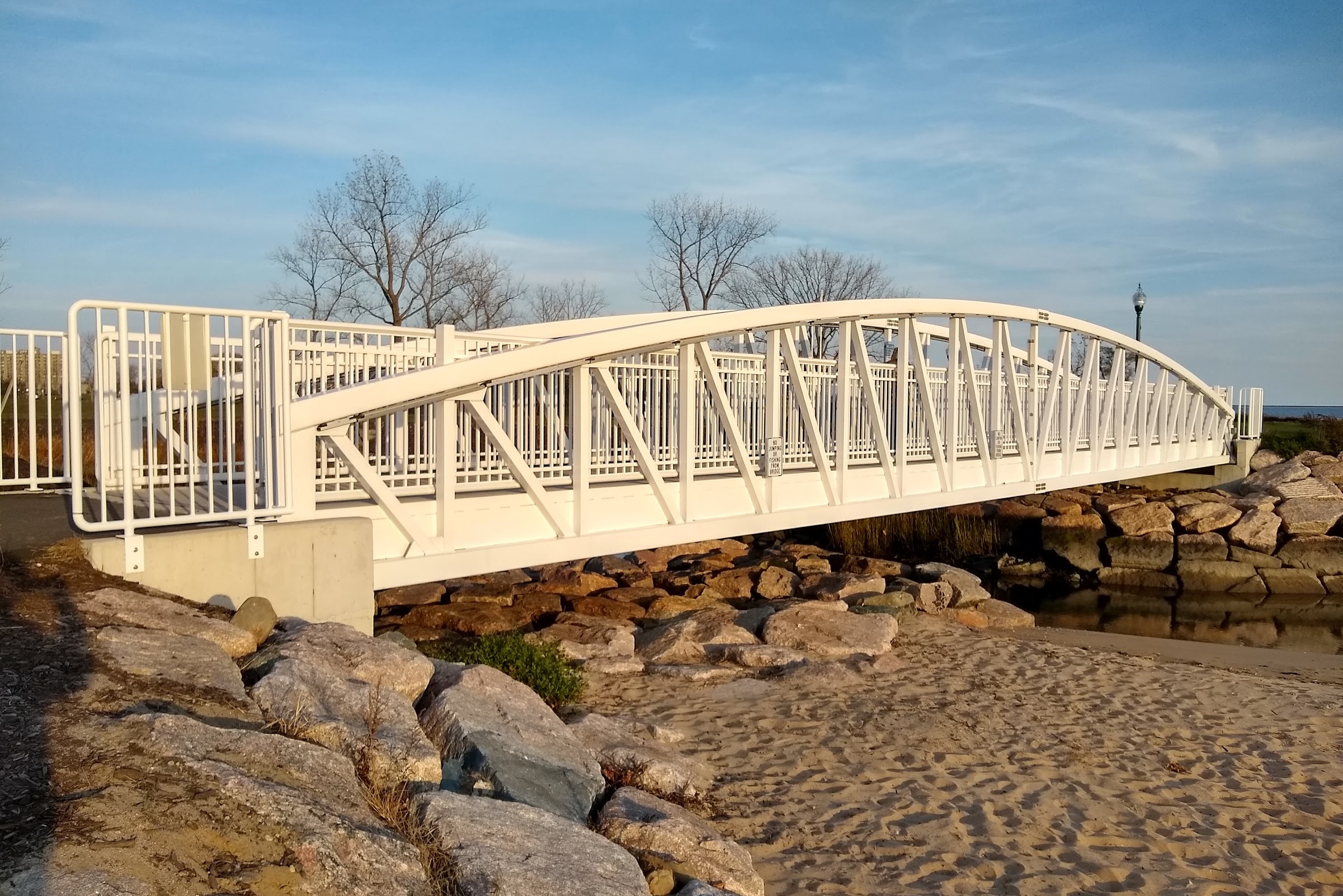
Bridge at river mouth

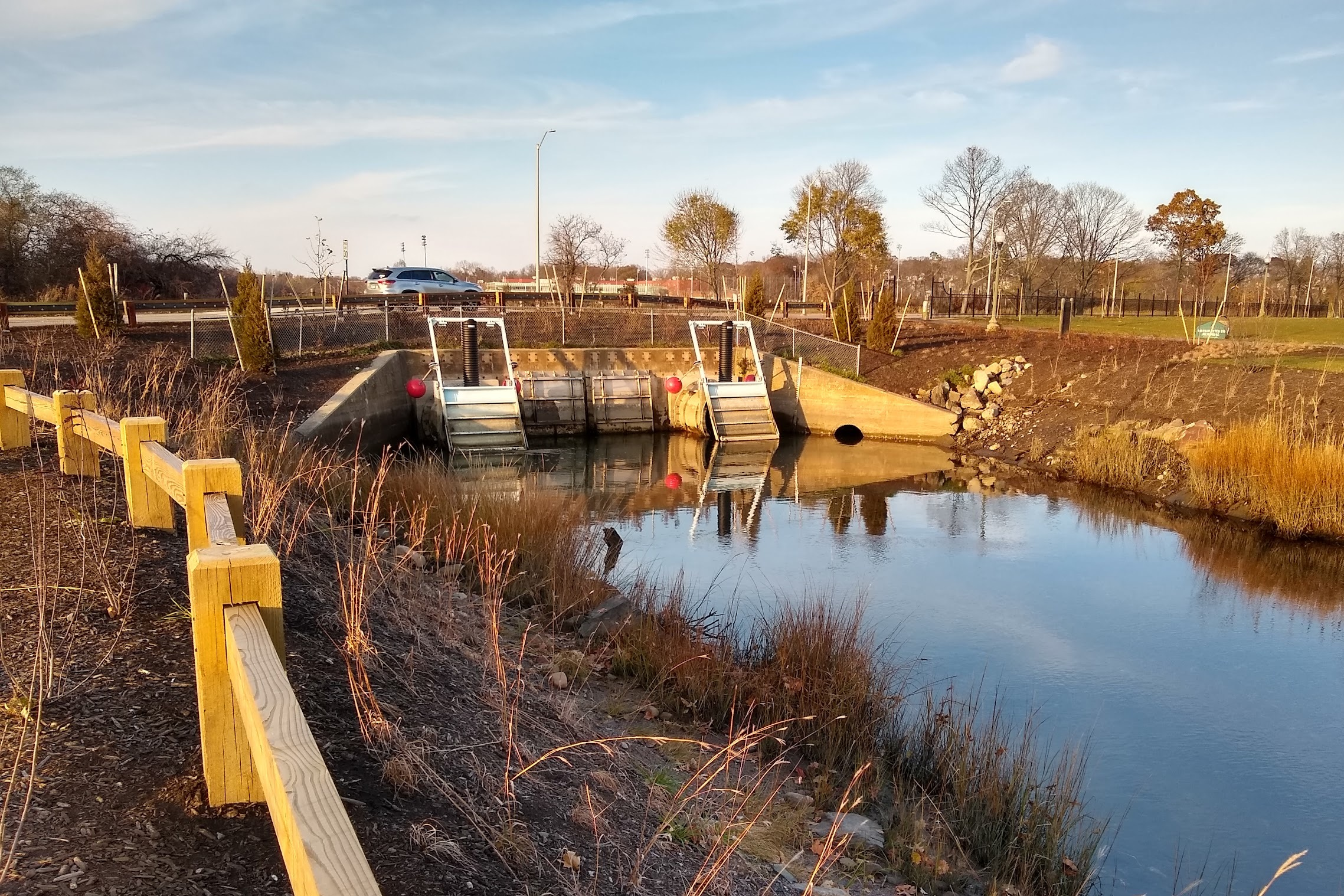
Flood gates

== See also ==
- List of rivers of Connecticut
