= West Haven High School =

Location
- 1 McDonough Plaza; West Haven, Connecticut 06516; United States; 41°15′36″N 72°57′31″W

Information
- Type: Public
- Motto: Gardez Bien
- School district: West Haven Public Schools
- CEEB code: 070910
- Principal: Robert Bohan
- Teaching staff: 111.50 (on an FTE basis)
- Grades: 9–12
- Enrollment: 1,793 (2023–2024)
- Student to teacher ratio: 16.08
- Colors: Blue, white, and Silver
- Athletics conference: Southern Connecticut Conference
- Mascot: Blue Devil
- Yearbook: Blue Flame
- Website: whhs.whschools.org

West Haven High School is a secondary school located in West Haven, Connecticut, which educates students in grades 9–12. The mascot of West Haven is the Blue Devil.

== Administration and campus ==
The school principal is Robert Bohan. West Haven High School enrolls about 1,700 students each year.

The current campus opened September 1963 at 1 Circle Street (also known as McDonough Plaza). Its previous location was the Carl C. Gianotti Jr. High School on Main Street, a building now used as a residential complex. Before that, it was on the corner of Center Street and Union Avenue, a building since used as a grammar school and senior housing.

== Academics ==
West Haven High School offers various non-core courses, including automotives, wood shop, metal shop, photography, graphic arts, drafting, video production, academics, art, and music courses. Among its notable programs are the Theater Workshop, JoAnn Andrees' Pillow Time Theatre and, in music, marching and concert bands, Bel Canto, Camerata and Concert Choir. Its chess team has won ten state championships and the school also has a successful mock trial team.

== Athletics ==
West Haven High School athletic facilities include Ken Strong Stadium (an artificial turf football field and track), an enclosed ice skating rink, indoor gymnasium and swimming pool, tennis courts, and baseball and softball fields. The Blue Devils soccer and lacrosse teams use the Ken Strong field. West Haven High is part of the Southern Connecticut Conference, Quinnipiac Division, for athletics. In wrestling, they share a co-op team with Platt Regional Vocational Technical School, which competes in the Constitution State Conference. Visit The West Haven Athletic Hall of Fame online.

- 1968 Football, State Championship, Team ranked 1st in Connecticut. (New Haven Register Sportswriters Poll, 9-0, Class LL), 4th in the United States (National Sports News Service Poll).
- 1972 Football, State Championship, Team ranked 1st in Connecticut. (New Haven Register Sportswriters Poll, 10-0, Class LL)
- 1986, 1987, 1989 Football, Class L State Championships, under the leadership of Coach Ed McCarthy.
- 2002 Football, Class LL State Championship, also under Ed McCarthy, Team ranked 1st in Connecticut. (New Haven Register Sportswriters Poll, 12-0, Class LL)
- 2003 Football, Class LL Semifinals Winner (lost to New Britain in the championship)
- 2009 Wrestling, CSC Championship Runners-up (4-0)
- 1984 Baseball, Class LL State Championship. The team defeated Crosby High High School 7-4 to capture the title.
- 2009 Baseball, Class LL State Championship. The team defeated Brian McMahon High School 1-0 to win Tommy Lawrence threw a 7 inning complete game shutout. He later on went on to be signed by the Tampa Bay Rays.

Note: 1976 was the first year of CIAC football playoffs; 1968 and 1972 Championships are unofficial.

- 1994 Division I State Champions in Ice Hockey
- 1990 Division I State Champions in Ice Hockey defeating Greenwich 4-0
- 1988 Division I State Champions in Ice Hockey

== Notable alumni ==
- Ulish Booker, professional football player.
- Art Ceccarelli, former MLB player.
- Patrick Earl Hammie, contemporary visual artist
- Tommy Nelson, actor
- Rob Jackson, former NFL linebacker
- Rob Radlosky, former MLB player
- Ken Strong, professional football player, inducted into the Pro Football Hall of Fame in 1967.
- Tommy Lawrence, former Professional Baseball Player
