= Maltby Lakes =

Lakes in Connecticut, USA

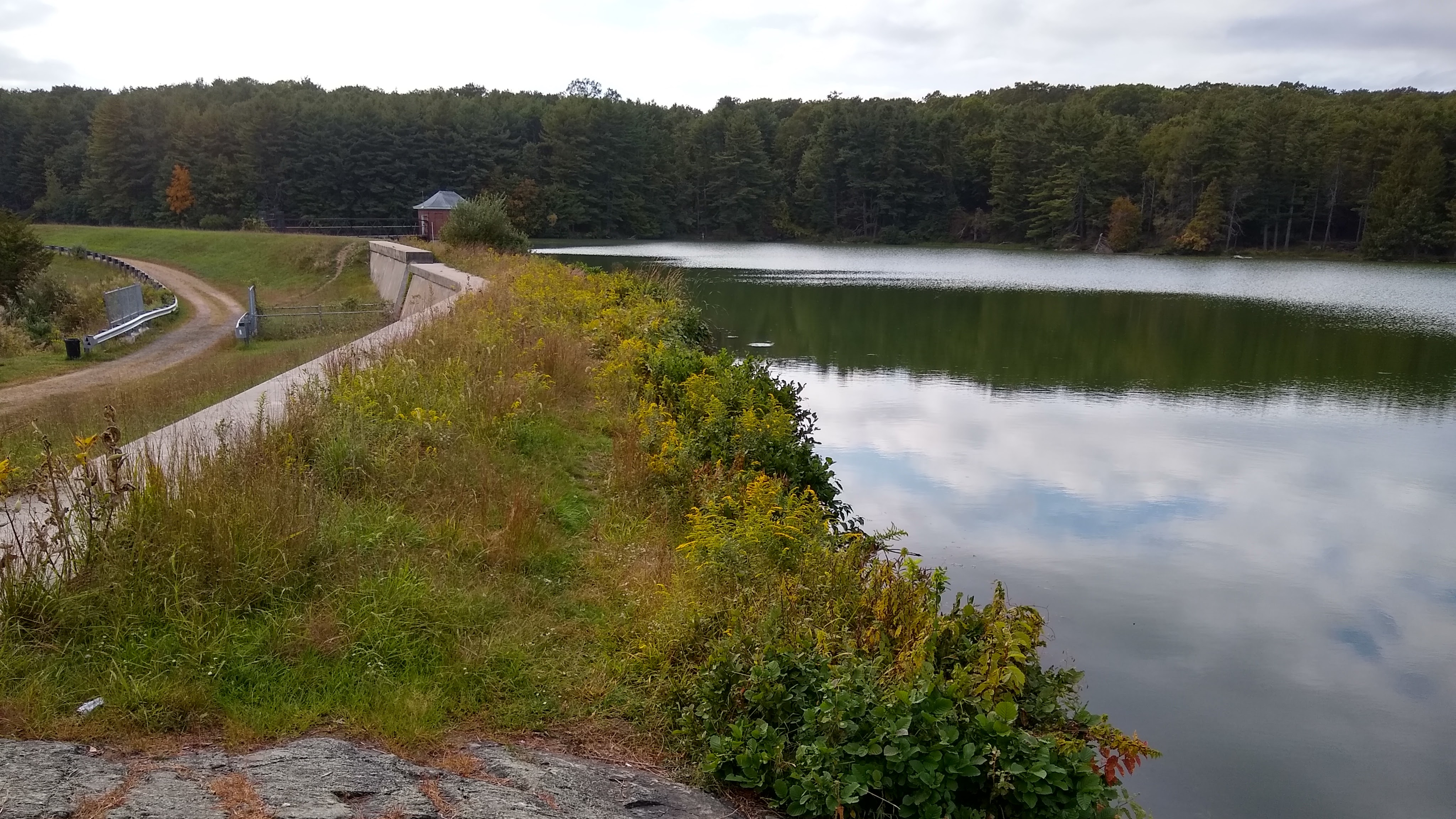
- Maltby Lake 2

- Location within Connecticut
- Location: West Haven, Connecticut, United States
- Coordinates: 41°18′18″N 72°58′39″W
- Type: Reservoir
- Basin countries: United States
- Surface area: 1: 18.9 acres (0.076 km^{2}), 2: 23 acres (0.093 km^{2}), 3: 25.3 acres (0.102 km^{2})
- Max. depth: 1: 17 feet (5.2 m), 2: 32 feet (9.8 m), 3: 26 feet (7.9 m)
- Surface elevation: 1: 150 ft (46 m), 2: 160 ft (49 m), 3: 160 ft (49 m)

Maltby Lakes is a set of three reservoirs in West Haven and Orange, Connecticut fed by the Cove River. The reservoirs are designated nominally 1, 2 and 3, each with a corresponding dam. The dams were constructed originally in 1862 with updates in 1992, 1999, and 2011. Maltby Lake 1 Dam is 240 feet (73 m) long. Dam 2 is 800 feet (240 m) long. Dam 3 is 750 feet (230 m) long. The lakes and surrounding area are owned by the South Central Connecticut Regional Water Authority. Approximately 4.87 miles (7,840 m) of trails at the lakes may be accessed by permit.

Maltby Lake Dam 1 creates a reservoir holding a maximum of 260.0 acre-feet (84.7×10^{6} US gal) of water. Maltby Lake Dam 2 holds 175.0 acre-feet (57.0×10^{6} US gal) and Maltby Lake Dam 3 holds 239.0 acre-feet (77.9×10^{6} US gal).

Lakes 2 and 3 flow into Lake 1. Water from the outflow of Lake 1 is diverted to the West River via the Horseshoe Lagoon making the system part of the West River Watershed.

== Images ==
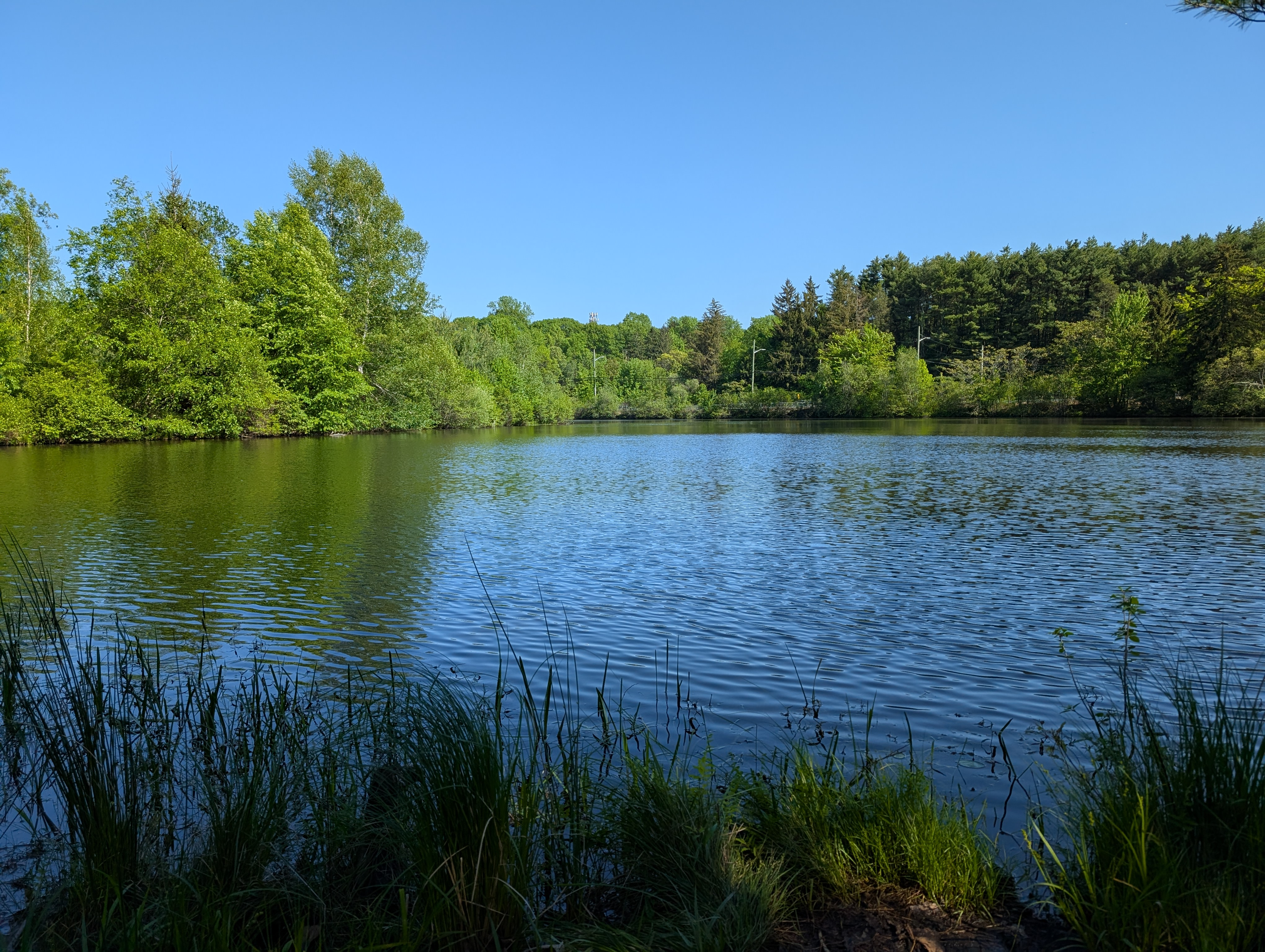
Maltby Lake 1

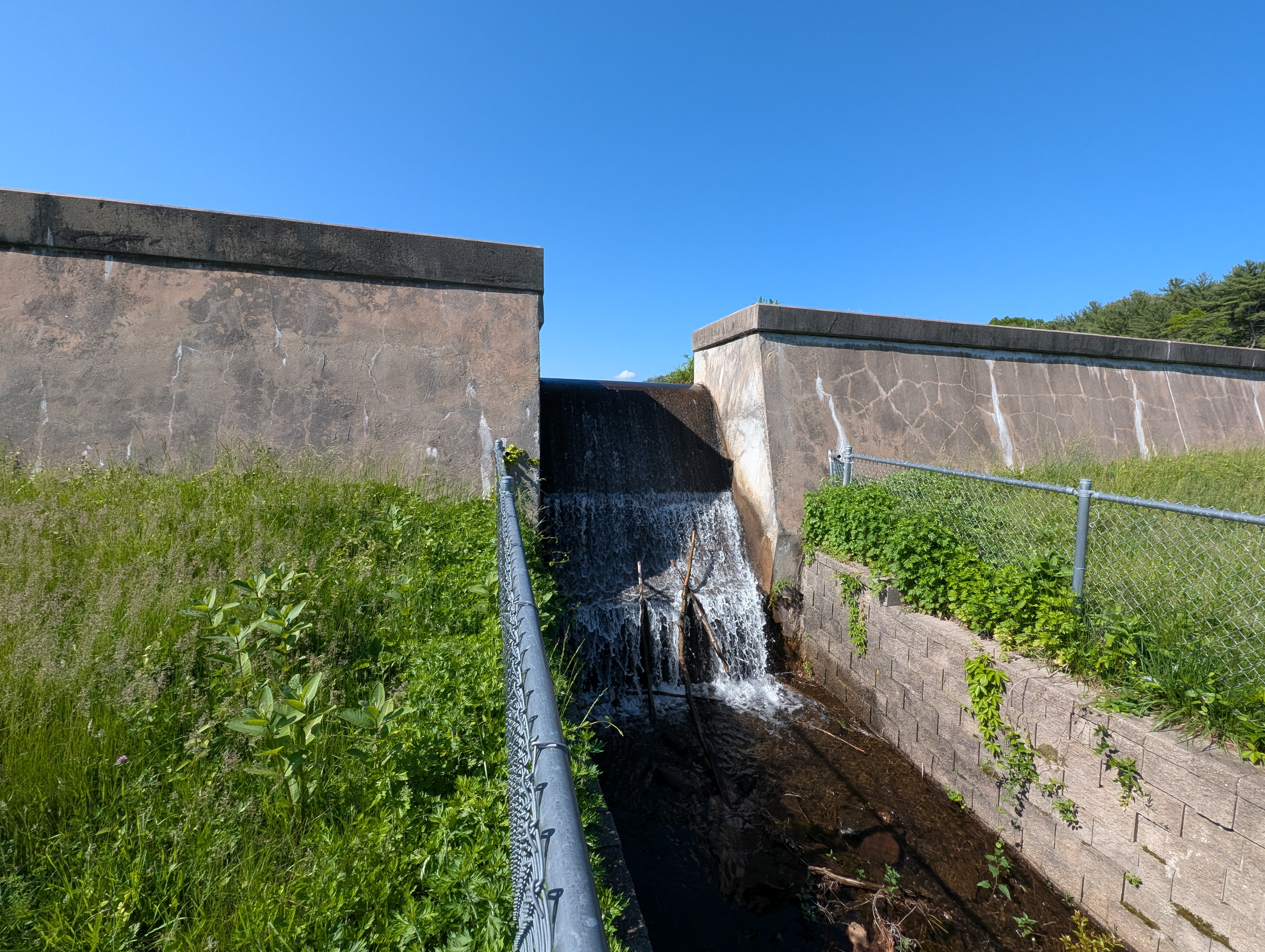
Maltby Lake 2 spillway

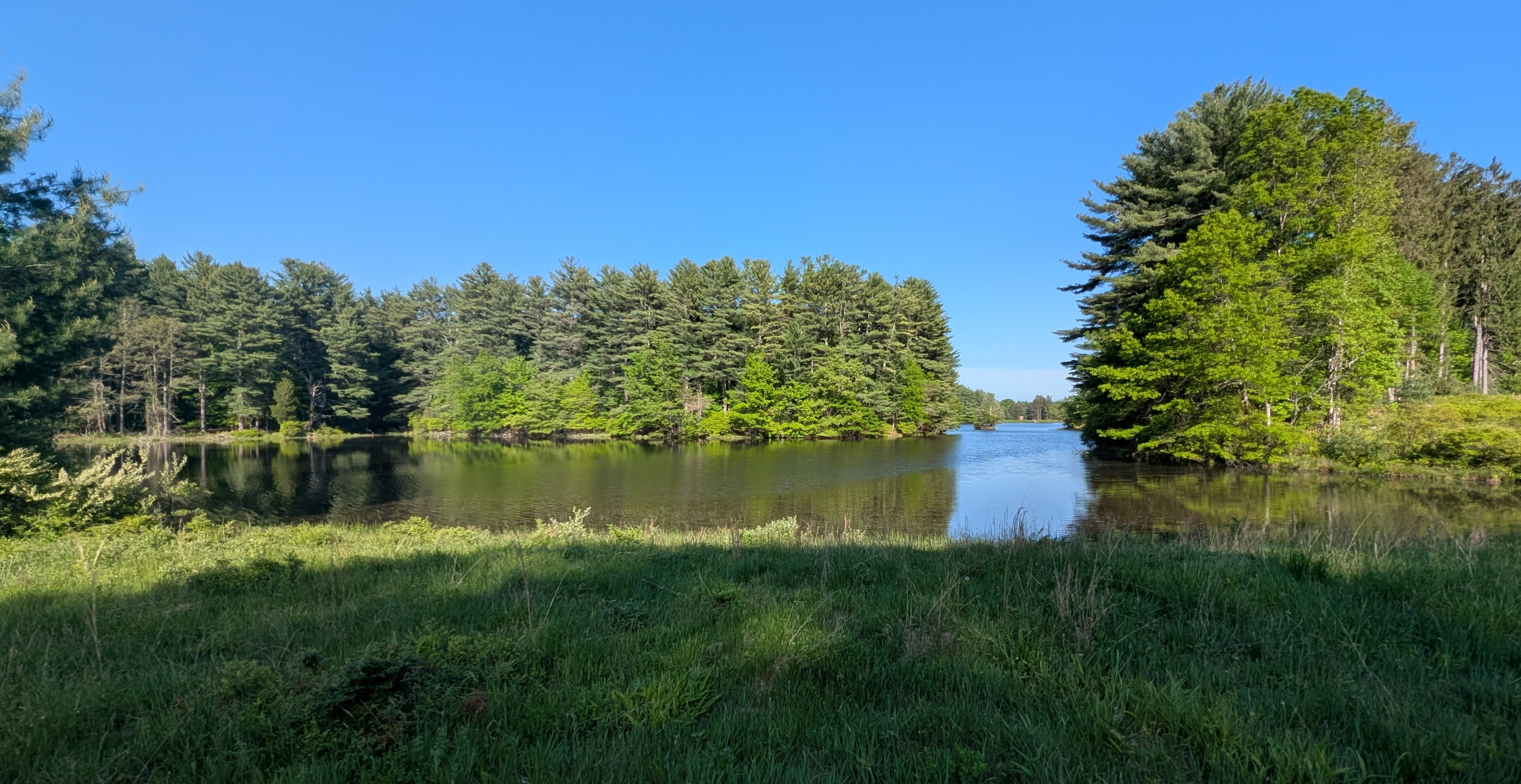
Maltby Lake 3

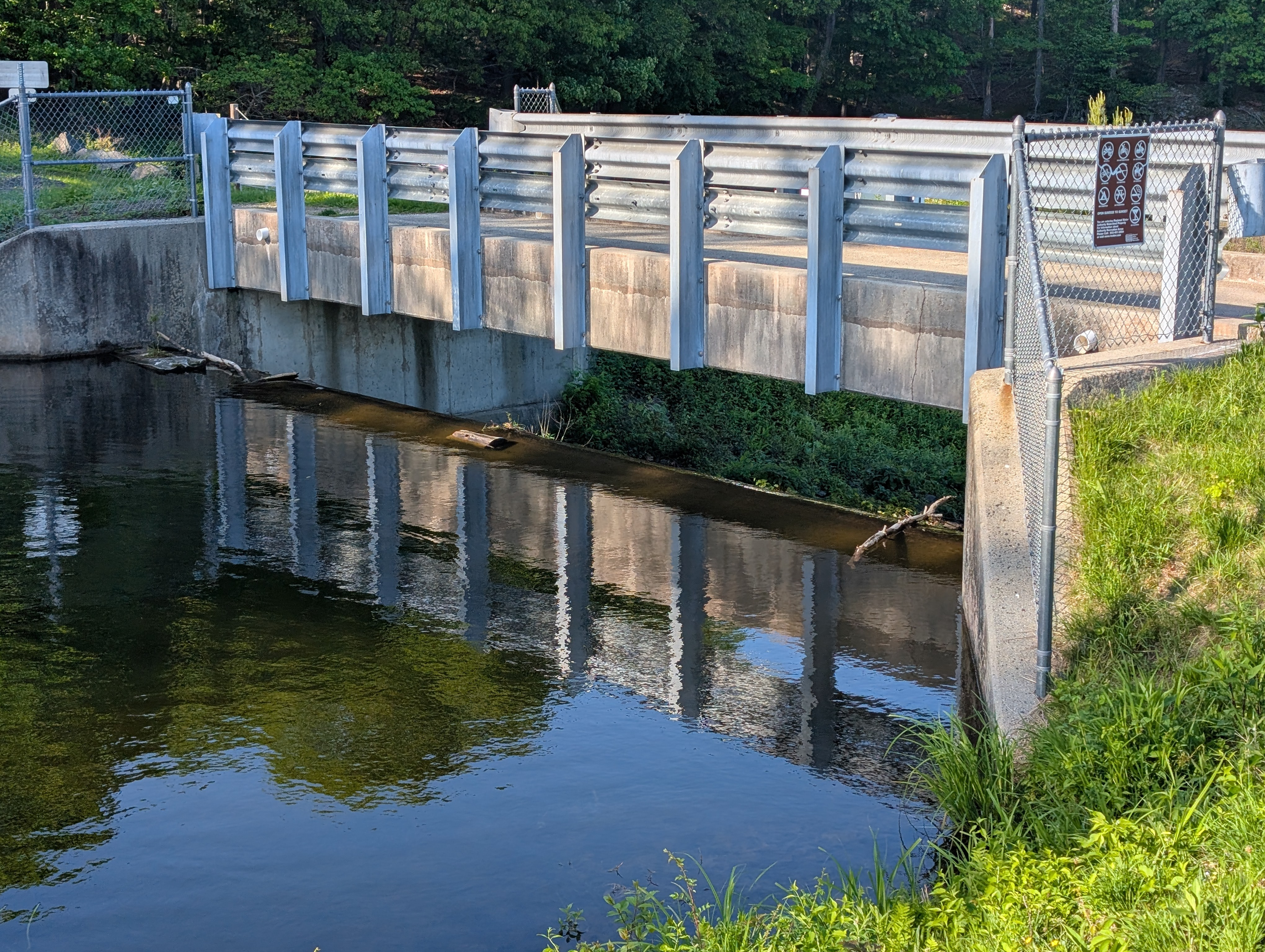
Maltby Lake 3 spillway
