= James Lide Coker =

American businessman (1837–1918)

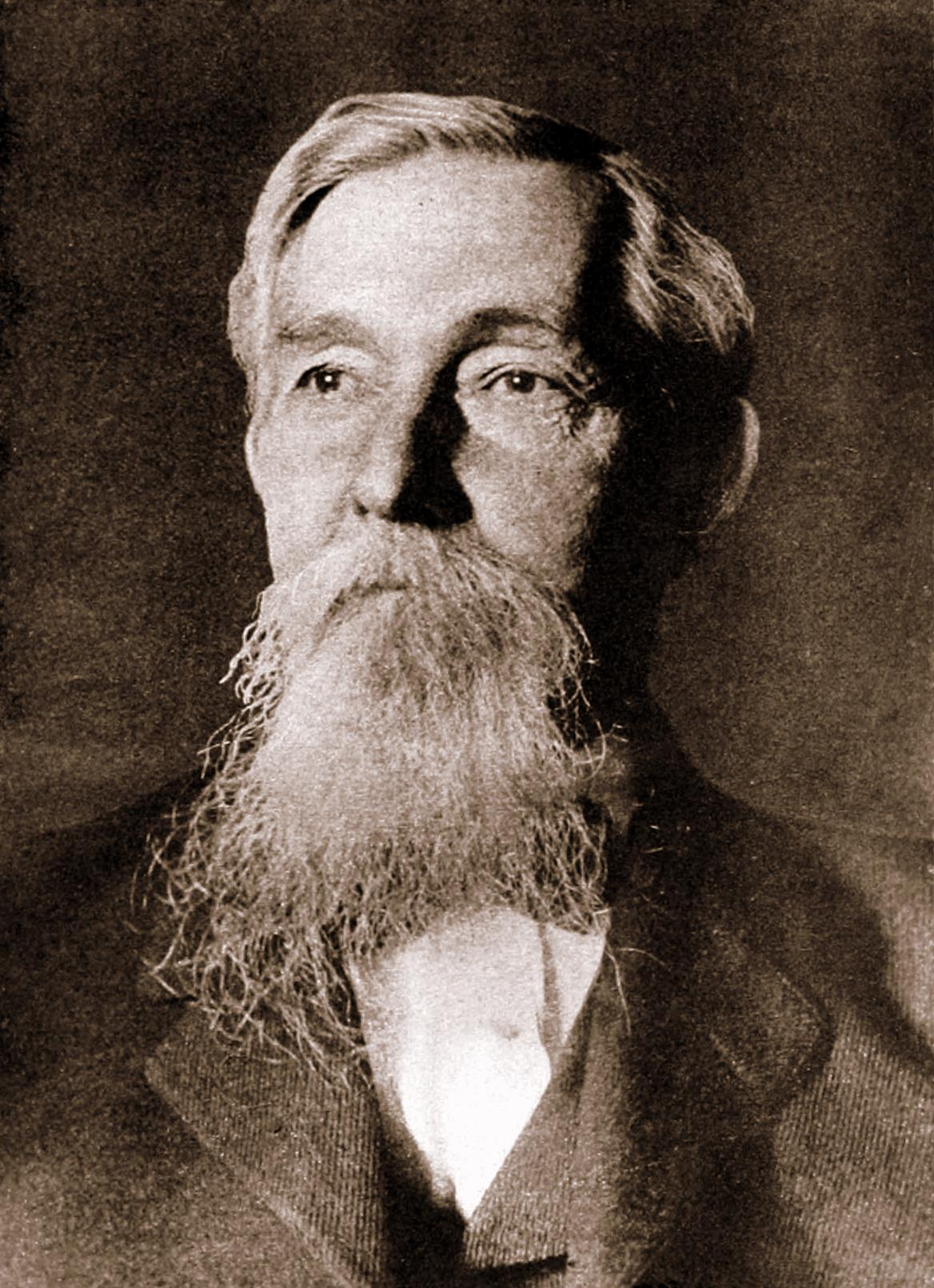
- Born: January 3, 1837.
- Occupation: businessman
- Notable work: Founded the Southern Novelty Company, later Sonoco Products Company.

Major James Lide Coker (January 3, 1837, in Society Hill, South Carolina – June 25, 1918, in Hartsville, South Carolina) was a businessman, merchant, industrialist, Christian philanthropist, and Civil War veteran, and the founder of Sonoco Products Company and Coker University.

Coker was the son of Caleb and Hannah Lide Coker and the great-grandson of Revolutionary War Captains Robert Lide, who moved to South Carolina from Roanoke, Virginia, in 1740, and Thomas Coker, who moved to South Carolina from Brunswick, Virginia, in 1735. Both men fought in Francis Marion's 2nd South Carolina Regiment at Fort Sullivan in 1776 and the Siege of Charleston in 1779 and were awarded tracts of land along the Pee Dee River following the war.

Coker and his descendants' contribution to economic, political, and cultural life in South Carolina is the subject of George Lee Simpson's The Cokers of Carolina: A Social Biography of a Family (UNC Press 1956). Coker's life and accomplishments have been documented in Dr. Will H. Joslin's God, Guts, and Gallantry: The Faith, Courage, and Accomplishments of Major James Lide Coker (Westbow Press 2021).

== Education and war service ==
Educated at St. David's Academy in Society Hill and The Citadel in Charleston, prior to starting his career in agriculture, Coker attended Harvard University to study heredity, genetics, and the scientific principles of farming. He married Sue Armstrong Stout in 1860, and they were the parents of nine children, six of whom survived childhood: Margaret, James Lide Jr., David, William, Jennie, Charles Westfield, and Susan.

After graduation, Coker enlisted in the Confederate Army during the American Civil War, and fought for the 6th and 9th South Carolina Regiments at First Manassas, the Battle of Malvern Hill, Second Manassas, the Battle of Harpers Ferry, and Antietam. In October 1863, Coker was wounded at the Battle of Chickamauga, and after a time as a prisoner of war, returned home to spend the rest of his life nursing a shattered hip. In March 1865, Coker set out with a large box of food supplies for the Confederate forces in Richmond. On his return to Hartsville, he learned that General Sherman's army had destroyed his family's farm.

== Business acumen ==
Coker embarked upon his career in the post-war economy with the stubborn conviction that the South's future hinged on the introduction of scientific principles to farming, coupled with the development of industry.

At the cessation of armed hostilities in April 1865, the Coker family began rebuilding. Although Sherman's army had left no work stock, Coker had cotton seed and seed corn, which he planted with the use of an old mule and a pair of oxen borrowed from an uncle. He planted 60 acres (240,000 m^{2}) of cotton and 40 acres (160,000 m^{2}) of corn, which yielded 25 bales of cotton and 300 bushels of corn. At the prevailing prices, 25 bales of cotton brought $1,700, a small fortune in that time.

Using those funds and others derived from mortgaging some of his land, Coker founded several businesses that were highly successful, including a cotton and naval trade post in Charleston, the Darlington Manufacturing Company, the Hartsville Cotton Mill, the Hartsville Oil Mill, and the Pedigreed Seed Company. Hartsville, South Carolina, has enjoyed lasting benefits from his decision to build his own railroad spur (at his own expense) when other town merchants would not agree to help fund construction. In 1881, he organized and was elected president of Darlington National Bank, the only bank in the county.

In 1890, Coker and his eldest son, James, began a search for a way to turn Southern pine trees into pulp for papermaking, and three years later, they had perfected a process. Shipping costs for the pulp made this business unprofitable, so Coker purchased his own papermaking equipment. That resulted in the formation of Carolina Fiber Company. With precious few nearby customers for paper, in 1899, Coker organized the Southern Novelty Company, later renamed Sonoco Products Company, to use some of the paper to produce cone-shaped yarn carriers. Today, Sonoco has over 19,900 employees in more than 335 operations in 33 countries, is a member of the Fortune 500 and the S&P400, and is South Carolina's largest corporation in terms of sales.

== Philanthropy and altruism ==
Coker was the driving force in the establishment of Welsh Neck High School, which later became Coker College for Women in 1908; he gave the college a $50,000 endowment and an additional $600,000 during his years as president, which have played a large part in ensuring its continued existence. In 1909–1910, he funded construction of Davidson Hall; it was listed on the National Register of Historic Places in 1983. Memorial Hall was built in 1913 and 1916, and added to the National Register in 1989.

Coker served his community as mayor of Hartsville, president of the Pee Dee Historical Society, and a member of the South Carolina House of Representatives, where he introduced the first bill for universal public education in South Carolina. As a faithful community servant, Coker also taught the boys' Sunday School at First Baptist Hartsville for thirty-eight years.

Coker was inducted into the South Carolina Business Hall of Fame in 1986.
