= Art Ceccarelli =

American baseball player (1930–2012)

- Pitcher
- Born: April 2, 1930; New Haven, Connecticut, U.S.
- Died: July 11, 2012 (aged 82); Orange, Connecticut, U.S.
- Batted: Right Threw: Left

MLB debut
- May 3, 1955, for the Kansas City Athletics

Last MLB appearance
- May 17, 1960, for the Chicago Cubs

MLB statistics
- Win–loss record: 9-18
- Earned run average: 5.05
- Strikeouts: 166
- Stats at Baseball Reference

Teams
- Kansas City Athletics (1955–1956); Baltimore Orioles (1957); Chicago Cubs (1959–1960)

Arthur Edward Ceccarelli (April 2, 1930 – July 11, 2012) was an American pitcher in Major League Baseball who played for the Kansas City Athletics, Baltimore Orioles, and Chicago Cubs in parts of five seasons spanning 1955–1960. Listed at 6' 0", 190 lb., he batted right-handed and threw left-handed.

Ceccarelli was a pitching star for West Haven High School in the 1940s before signing a bonus contract with the Brooklyn Dodgers in 1948.

In 1949, he set a Georgia–Florida League season record with 294 strikeouts, an average of 12.6 per each nine innings. His baseball career was briefly interrupted while serving in the Korean War from 1950 through 1952. After discharging, he pitched three seasons of minor league ball before joining the majors in 1955 with the Athletics.

In five big league seasons, Ceccarelli posted a 9–18 record and a 5.05 earned run average in 79 pitching appearances (42 starts). His most productive became in 1959, when he went 5–5 with four complete games and a pair of shutouts for the Cubs. That included a string of four straight wins, a streak capped by a complete-game victory over a San Francisco Giants' lineup that included Willie Mays and Orlando Cepeda. One of the most notable games of his career came in a 3–0 win over the Los Angeles Dodgers. Ceccarelli pitched 10 innings and became the only left-handed pitcher to defeat Sandy Koufax in the Coliseum. His baseball idol was Ted Williams stating in an interview he had walked a batter just to have the chance to pitch against him.

During the off seasons, Ceccarelli attended classes at Southern Connecticut State University, where he also served as a pitching coach for the SCSU baseball team. Besides this, he taught History and English at both Milford and Foran High School.

He and wife Katherine had three children Sherri, Gregg and Richard as well as four grandchildren.
