= Coker University =

Private university in Hartsville, South Carolina, U.S.

- Former names: Coker College for Women (1908–1969); Coker College (1969–2019)
- Type: Private university
- Established: 1908; 118 years ago
- Founder: James Lide Coker
- Endowment: $34.97 million (2024)
- President: Natalie Harder
- Provost: Susan Daniels Henderson
- Faculty: 49 full-time 62 adjunct
- Students: 1,160 (Fall 2022)
- Location: Hartsville, South Carolina, U.S. 34°22′36.4″N 80°04′10″W
- Colors: Navy Blue, Light Blue, & Gold
- Nickname: Cobras
- Sporting affiliations: NCAA Division II – South Atlantic
- Website: coker.edu
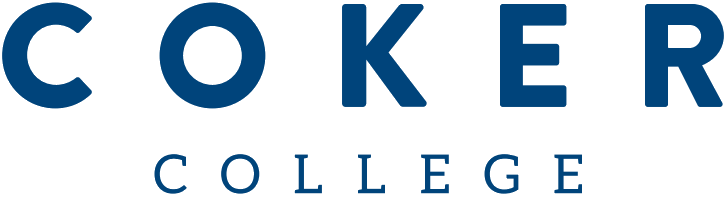

Coker University is a private university in Hartsville, South Carolina, United States. It was founded in 1908 and is accredited by the Southern Association of Colleges and Schools. Coker's sports teams, nicknamed the Cobras, compete in NCAA Division II.

== History ==
Coker University began in 1894 as "Welsh Neck High School", founded by a local businessman and American Civil War veteran, Major James Lide Coker. In 1908, when South Carolina created a statewide public school system, Coker led the effort to convert the school to "Coker College for Women". Davidson Hall and Memorial Hall are listed on the National Register of Historic Places.

Coker was once affiliated with the South Carolina Baptist Convention, but has been non-denominational since 1944. It officially became co-educational in 1969, although men had attended since World War II's end.

The South Carolina Governor's School for Science and Mathematics was located on the Coker campus from its founding in 1988 until 2003 when it moved to a purpose-built campus nearby.

Effective July 1, 2019, Coker College adopted the name Coker University.

=== Presidents ===
- James Lide Coker
- E. V. Baldy (1909–1911)
- Arthur Jackson Hall (1911–1914)
- Howard Lee Jones (1914–1915)
- E. Walter Sikes (1916–1925)
- Carlyle Campbell (1925–1936)
- C. Sylvester Green (1936–1944)
- Donald C. Agnew (1944–1952)
- Joseph C. Robert (1952–1955)
- John A. Barry, Jr. (1955–1959)
- Fenton Keyes (1960–1968)
- Wilfrid H. Callcott (1968–1969)
- Gus Turbeville (1969–1974)
- C. Hilburn Womble (1975–1980)
- James D. Daniels (1981–2002)
- B. James Dawson (2002–2009)
- Robert L. Wyatt (2009–2019)
- Natalie Harder (2020- )

== Academics ==
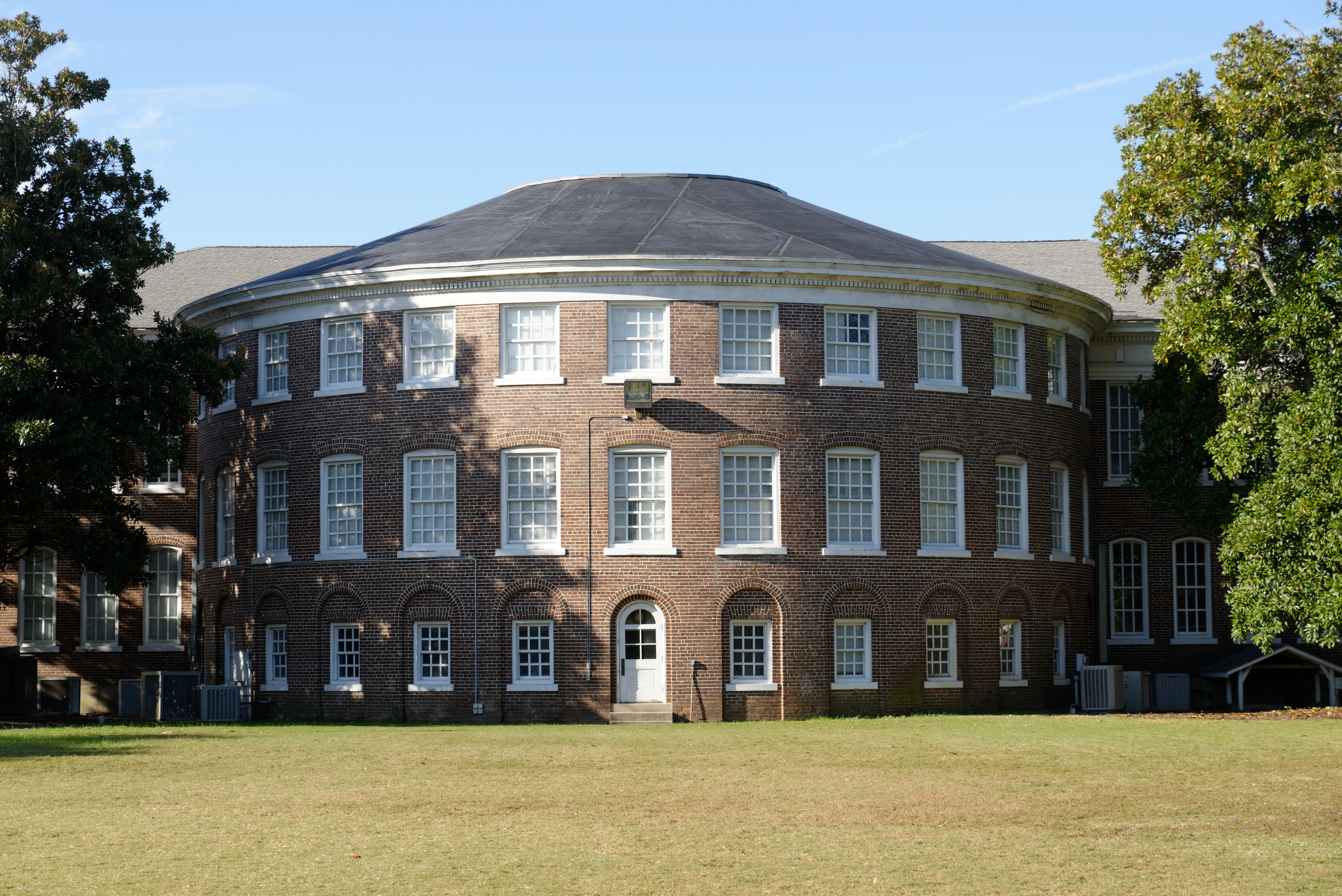
Rear of Davidson Hall, building on the NRHP

Coker refers to the academic program for the four-year undergraduate degree as the Trans4mations Program, with the first year being foundational, the second year requiring service and attendance at cultural events, the third year requiring at least two weeks of study off-campus, and the final year called a "capstone". The Liberal Arts Studies Program (LASP) is divided into Core Skills, Knowledge of the Arts, Knowledge of the Behavioral Sciences, Knowledge of the Humanities, Knowledge of the Natural Sciences, Knowledge of the United States, and Knowledge of the Wider World.

Coker offers 29 majors and 23 minors of study. The college also offers individual majors and double majors, self-designated degree programs, specializations, and pre-professional programs.

== Campus ==
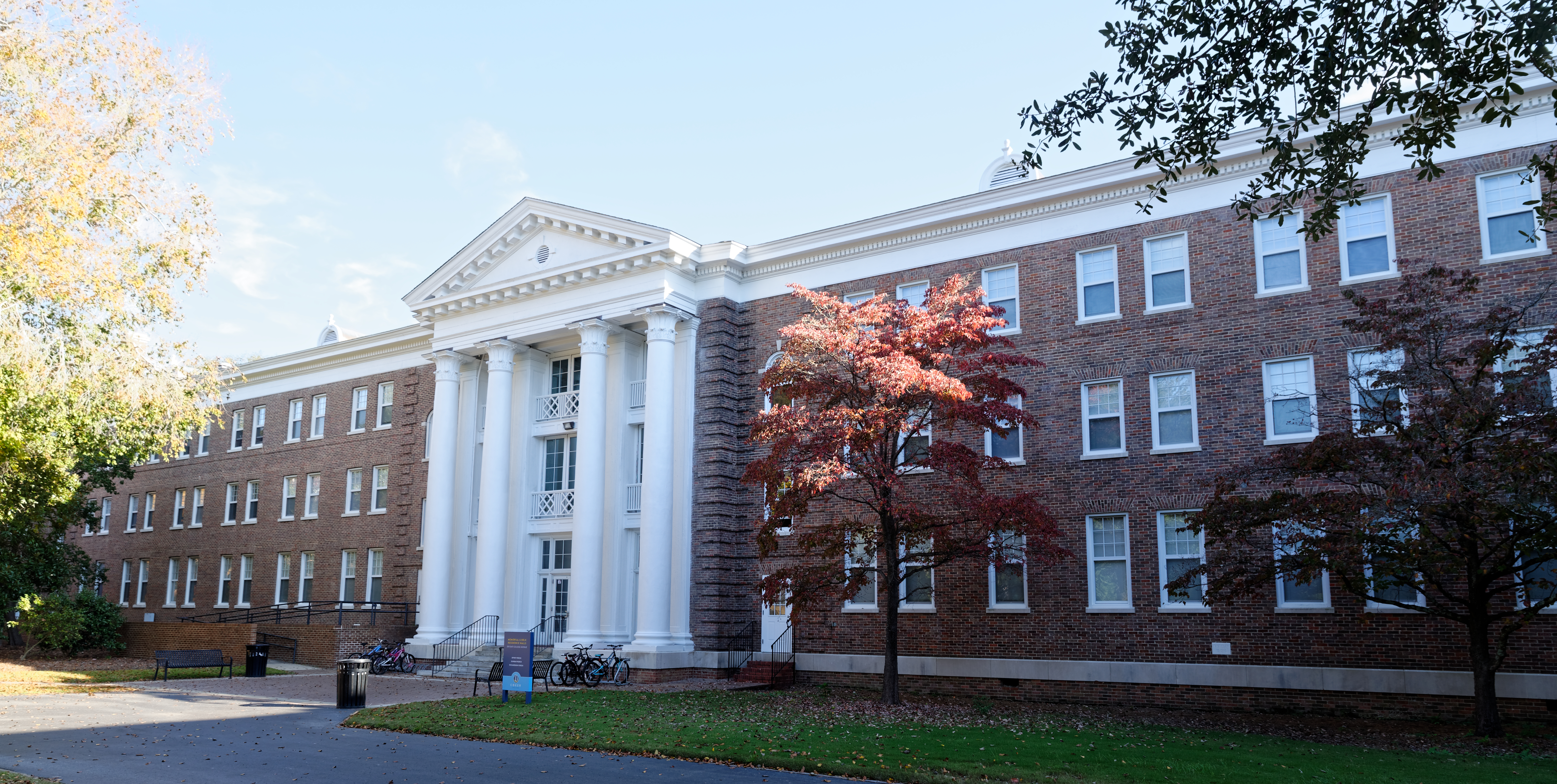
Memorial Hall, building on the NRHP

The 15-acre (6.1 ha) main campus contains mostly Georgian-style brick buildings, some of which (such as Davidson Hall, home to the college's round table classrooms) are listed on the National Register of Historic Places. The Alumni House (Drengaelen), The President's House, The Dean's and President's Offices (David and May Coker House), and The Registrar's Offices (Lawton-Wilson House) are all located in old mansions along the northern edge of campus.

Hartsville and Coker University owe much to the generosity of the Coker family, founders of Sonoco and Coker's Pedigreed Seed Company. The Coker family's patronage of the college has led to the vast majority of buildings on campus having Coker somewhere in the name. Students often joke to freshmen or visitors that they'll meet them "in the Coker" building as a way to gently initiate newcomers to campus.

=== Residence halls ===
JLC III Residence Hall

On-campus residence halls include Memorial (1914), Belk (1916), Coker (1916), Grannis (1969), and JLC (2009). Coker University’s Village at Byerly Place, consisting of George and Sullivan Halls opened in 2013. In 2011, Coker opened the Coker Downtown Lofts and in 2012 the Downtown Flats, both located in downtown Hartsville.

=== Library ===
In January 2008, the Charles W. and Joan S. Coker Library-Information Technology Center opened. The library was built using donations from a capital campaign. The former James Lide Coker Memorial Library is now a residence hall.

== Athletics ==
Coker Cobras
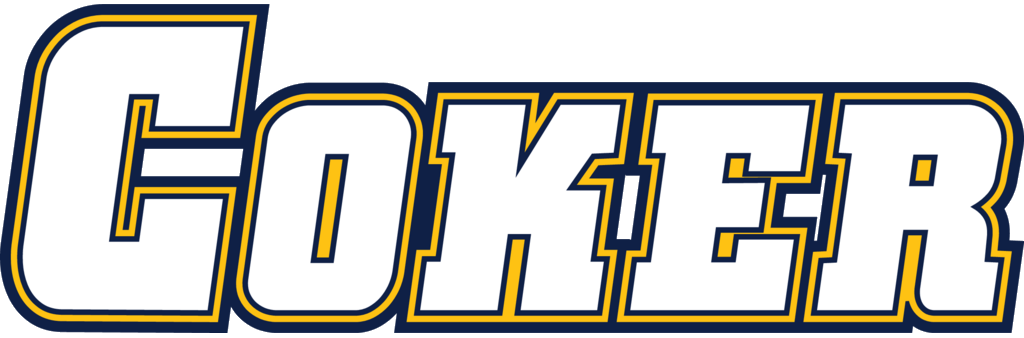
- University: Coker University
- Nickname: Cobras
- NCAA: Division II
- Conference: South Atlantic (primary); Conference Carolinas (acrobatics & tumbling)
- Athletic director: Lynn Griffin
- Location: Hartsville, South Carolina
- Varsity teams: 21 (9 men's, 11 women's, 1 co-ed)
- Basketball arena: DeLoach Center
- Baseball stadium: Tom J. New Baseball Field
- Softball stadium: Saleeby-Stokes Softball Field
- Soccer field: Coker Athletic Field
- Lacrosse stadium: Coker Athletic Field
- Tennis venue: Coker Tennis Courts
- Colors: Navy and gold
- Mascot: Striker the Cobra
- Website: www.cokercobras.com

Adjacent to the main campus is a 22-acre (8.9 ha) athletics complex with baseball, softball, soccer, and tennis facilities. Near the athletics complex is the DeLoach Center, which contains a 1,908-seat gymnasium, an auxiliary gym, interactive classrooms, a student-athlete-only weight room, a fitness center, athletic offices, and more.

Coker has 21 varsity athletics programs, which primarily compete in The South Atlantic Conference. Sponsored programs include baseball, men's and women's basketball, men's and women's cross country, women's field hockey, men's and women's golf, men's and women's lacrosse, men's and women's soccer, softball, men's and women's tennis, men's and women's track and field (indoor and outdoor) women's volleyball, and men's wrestling. The Cobras also host a spirit squad.

In the 2013 season, the Coker baseball team won the Conference Carolinas Tournament title, earned the team's first-ever postseason bid, won the NCAA Southeast Regional, and advanced to the NCAA DII Baseball National Championship. They finished the year with a record of 38–16.

== Notable alumni ==
- Bonnie Ethel Cone, founder of University of North Carolina at Charlotte
- Terrance Hayes, poet
- Patrick Earl Hammie, artist
- Harvey Hilbert, psychologist and expert on post-Vietnam stress syndrome
- Marian McKnight, Miss America 1957
- Ruth Patrick, botanist and limnologist
- Edith Mitchell Dabbs, author

== See also ==
- Davidson Hall, Coker College
- Memorial Hall
