= Sonoco =

United States-based international provider of diversified consumer packaging

Sonoco Products Company
- Type: Public
- Traded as: NYSE: SON; S&P 400 Component
- Industry: Packaging
- Founded: 1899
- Founder: Major James Lide Coker
- Headquarters: Hartsville, South Carolina, United States
- Key people: Howard Coker (CEO)
- Revenue: ▼US$5.237 Billion (Fiscal Year Ended December 31, 2020)
- Operating income: ▼US$255.592 Million (Fiscal Year Ended December 31, 2020)
- Net income: ▼US$207.241 Million (Fiscal Year Ended December 31, 2020)
- Total assets: ▲US$5.277 Billion (Fiscal Year Ended December 31, 2020)
- Total equity: ▲US$1.910 Billion (Fiscal Year Ended December 31, 2020)
- Number of employees: 21,000 (2017)
- Website: www.sonoco.com

Sonoco Products Company is an American provider of diversified consumer packaging, industrial products, protective packaging, and packaging supply chain services and the world's largest producer of composite cans, tubes, and cores. The company was founded in 1889 as Southern Novelty Company with annualized net sales of approximately $7.3 billion. Sonoco has 19,900 employees in more than 335 operations in 33 countries, serving more than 85 nations. The company is headquartered in Hartsville, South Carolina, and is South Carolina's largest corporation in terms of sales.

Sonoco is a member of the New York Stock Exchange Century Index and the S&P 400.

== Operations ==
Sonoco is the world's largest producer of tubes, cores, and fiber concrete columns under the brand name Sonotube concrete forms and a leading manufacturer of blow-molded plastic containers, consumer and industrial thermoformed plastic packaging, engineered molded and extruded plastic products, rigid paperboard containers, and convenience closures.

Sonoco's operations consist of its consumer packaging businesses, including Global Rigid Paper and Closures, Global Flexibles, and Global Plastics; its Global Services division, which provides high-impact retail displays and packaging supply chain management; its Industrial Converted Products businesses, which manufacture tubes and cores and reels for the wire and cable industry, produces uncoated recycled paperboard globally for Sonoco's fiber-based packaging divisions and external converters, and includes Sonoco Recycling, one of the world's largest recyclers; and its Protective Packaging division, which produces highly engineered, custom-designed protective, temperature-assurance, and retail security packaging.

In September 2023, it was announced Sonoco has completed the acquisition of the US packaging company RTS Packaging from its holding company, WestRock for $330 million.

In December 2024, it was announced that Sonoco entered an agreement to sell its Thermoformed Flexible Packaging business (TFP) to TOPPAN Holdings, for approximately USD 1.8 billion.

== Sustainability ==
Sonoco was named the top global packaging company for sustainability and corporate responsibility in the 2011 and 2012 the Dow Jones Sustainability World Index. The firm also received Sustainable Asset Management (SAM) Gold Class Awards in SAM's Sustainability Yearbook in 2011, 2012, and 2013, was named one of the Top 100 Corporate Citizens by Corporate Responsibility Magazine in 2011 and 2012, and has been listed among the United States's 500 largest publicly traded companies in Newsweek magazine's "Green Rankings" for three consecutive years.

Sonoco Recycling annually collects approximately 3 million tons of old corrugated containers, various grades of paper, metals and plastics. The company also provides recycling programs for many large consumer product companies in the U.S. .

== Administration employees ==
- Major James Lide Coker founded the Southern Novelty Company in 1899, which became Sonoco in 1923.
- Charles W. Coker, President 1970–1990, CEO 1970–1998, and chairman 1976–2005.
- Harris E. DeLoach Jr., Executive Chairman of the board, and former CEO previous to M. Jack Sanders.
- M. Jack Sanders, President and chief executive officer 2013–2018.
- Rob C. Tiede, President and chief executive officer; 2018–2020.
- R. Howard Coker, President and chief executive officer; Elected 2020.

On November 9, 2026, Sonoco announced that Ernest D. Haynes III would succeed Howard Coker as president and chief executive when Coker retires on December 31, 2026.
