= Adherent culture =

Laboratory cell cultures in which cells attach to a surface

Adherent cell cultures are a type of cell culture that requires cells to be attached to a surface in order for growth to occur. Most vertebrate-derived cells (with the exception of hematopoietic cells) are anchorage dependent and require a two-dimensional monolayer to facilitate cell adhesion, spreading and replication. Cell samples can be taken from tissue explants or cell suspension cultures. Adherent cell cultures with an excess of nutrient-containing growth medium will continue to grow until they cover the available surface area. Proteases like trypsin are most commonly used to break the adhesion from the cells to the flask. Alternatively, cell scrapers can be used to mechanically break the adhesion if introducing proteases could damage the cell cultures. Unlike suspension cultures, the other main type of cell culture, adherent cultures require regular passaging performed using mechanical or enzymatic dissociation. The culture can be visualized using an inverted microscope, however the growth of adherent cultures is dependent on the available surface area. For this reason, adherent cell cultures are not commonly used to obtain a high yield of cells, instead the use of suspension cultures is preferred.

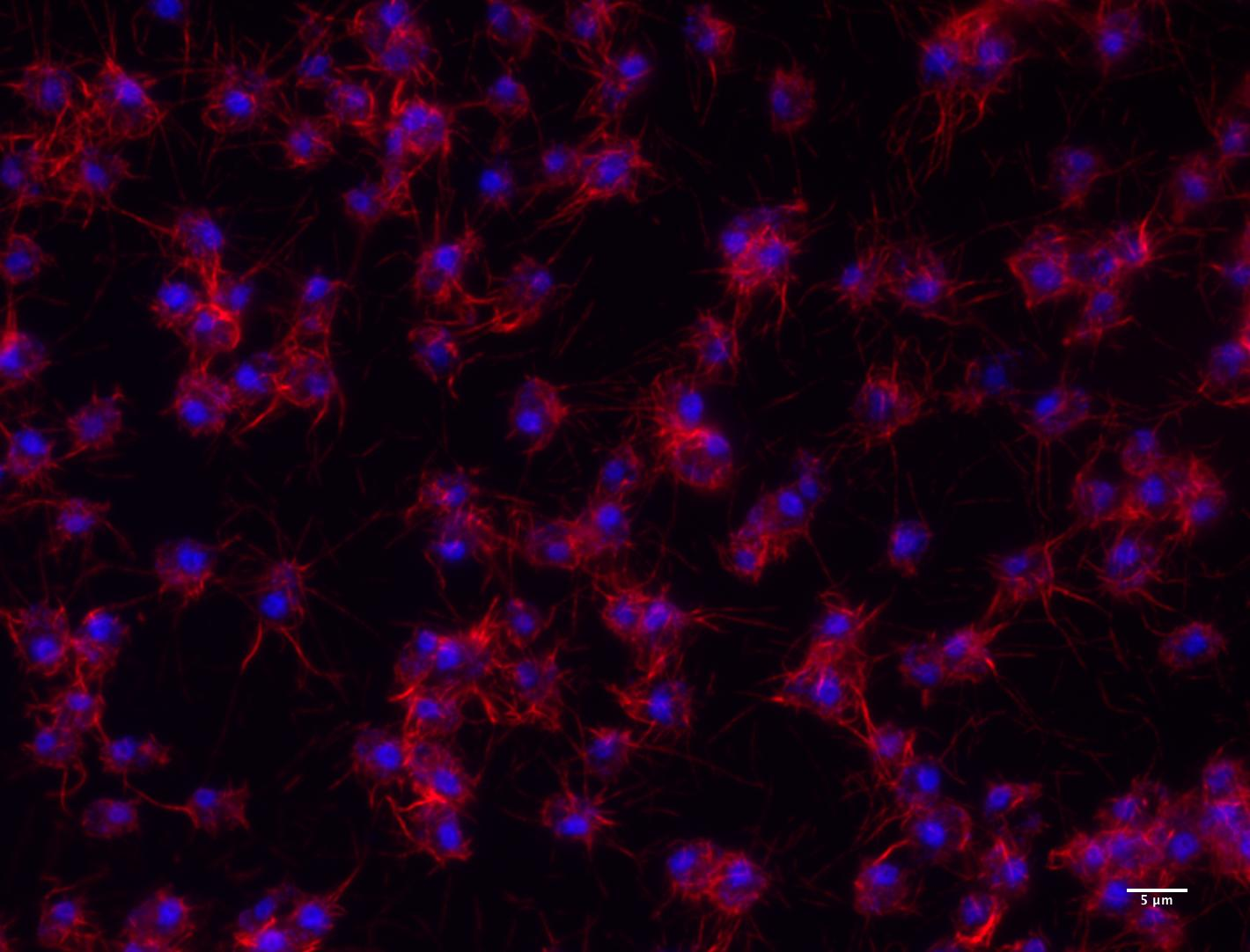
Capsaspora owczarzaki adherent cells visualized using fluorescence microscopy.

== Methods and maintenance ==
=== Isolating cells ===
Primary cells used for adherent cultures must be isolated and treated from a subject, or may be transferred from pre-existing cell lines. Adherent cells must first be transferred to a monolayer attached to a surface, and are categorized by their morphological differences. Fibroblast-like adherent cells have a linear and stretched shape, and migrate when attached to the monolayer. Epithelial-like adherent cells have a wider and polygonal shape, and do not migrate when attached to the monolayer. Once cells are properly isolated from their source and are transferred to the media, cell passaging can be conducted.

=== Adherent cell culture maintenance for laboratories ===
While passaging adherent cell cultures, spent media must be repeatedly pipetted out and replaced with fresh media. The culture vessel can also be repeatedly tapped, which should be combined with either mechanical or enzymatic methods to facilitate cell detachment. The culture vessel can also be centrifuged, forming a supernatant that can be extracted using a pipette. Cells must be fed 2 to 3 times per week, and must be cultured at an appropriate temperature, humidity, light, and pH in order to ensure optimal cell proliferation.

=== Passaging (subculturing) cells ===
While adherent cultures share similarities with suspension cultures, there are many key differences in how they are cultured and passaged. For adherent culture passaging, the spent media is first pipetted out of the flask containing cells as a waste product. Cells are adhered to the media that was not removed in a culture vessel, and a series of wash and incubation steps are then necessary to detach the cells. For the wash steps, a balanced salt solution is poured to the side opposite the cell culture, and the culture vessel is then shaken before draining the balanced salt solution. Heat is applied to the culture vessel for the incubation steps, causing protein denaturation and the gradual separation of the cells from the media. Similarly to suspension cultures, the total number of cells can then be calculated using a hemocytometer and trypan blue.

Epithelial cells that reach confluence normally swiftly stop dividing due to contact inhibition of growth related to the formation of intercellular adherens junctions.

== Commercial applications and limitations ==
Adherent cultures are most commonly used for cytology and for harvesting cellular products on a small scale. Since their growth is limited to 2D, it is difficult to use adherent cultures to study in-vivo cell structure and function. Research is being done to grow adherent cell cultures using 3D microcarriers in order to avoid this limitation and to use adherent cell cultures for drug testing.

Commercial applications of adherent cultures include:

- Producing adherent cells that create proteins of interest used for vaccine development.
- Adherent cells used in conjunction with viral vectors for cell and gene therapy.
- Delivering micro and nanotechnology to adherent cells in vitro.
- Adjusting adherent cell morphology for cancer cell screening.
