= Sarah Bergbreiter =

Micro-roboticist

- Citizenship: U.S.A.
- Education: University of California, Berkeley (P.h.d Microbotics)
- Alma mater: Princeton University, University of California, Berkeley
- Employer: Carnegie Mellon University
- Known for: Research on engineering robotic systems
- Title: Associate Professor

Sarah Bergbreiter is a professor of Mechanical Engineering at Carnegie Mellon University, previously a professor at the University of Maryland.

== Early life and education ==
Bergbreiter received her B.S.E degree in electrical engineering from Princeton University, and her M.S. and Ph.D. from the University of California, Berkeley.

== Career ==
Bergbreiter started her career as an assistant professor of mechanical engineering at the University of Maryland, college Park in 2008 at the same time, appointed in the Institute for Systems Research. In the fall of 2018, she joined Carnegie Mellon University under the Department of Mechanical Engineering. Her research has specifically focused on microrobotics, with projects influencing the medicine and consumer electronic spheres. She has given TED Talks highlighting her micro robots that can jump over 80 times their height. One such micro robot is the 4 millimeter "flea".

== Awards and recognitions ==
She has won multiple awards for her work, including the Defense Advanced Research Projects Agency(DARPA) Young Faculty Award in 2008, the National Science Foundation (NSF) CAREER Award in 2011, and the Presidential Early Career Award for Scientists and Engineers (PECASE) Award in 2013.

== See also ==
- Elizabeth Wayne
- Kristy M. Ainslie
