= Electroextraction =

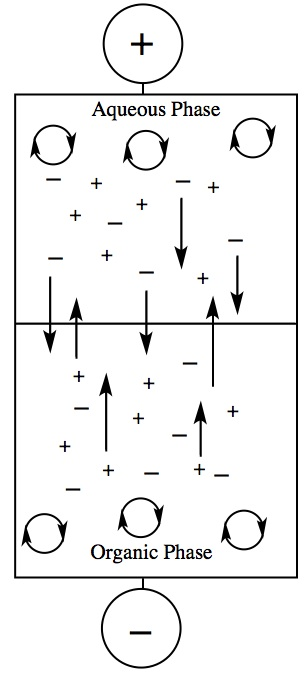
Figure 1. A diagram of the electroextraction process. Particles cross the phase barrier while any convective mixing is constrained to each phase

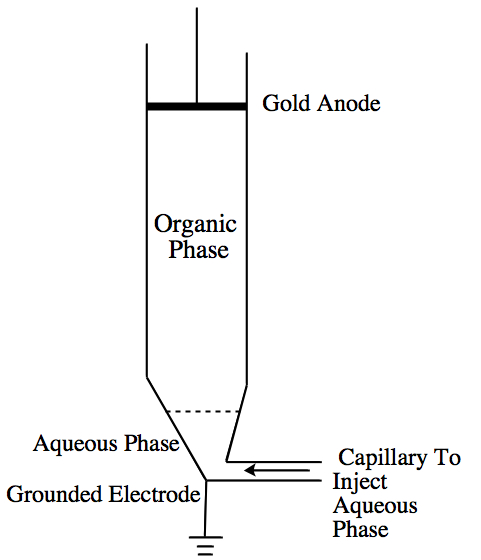
Figure 2. A diagram of an electroextraction apparatus

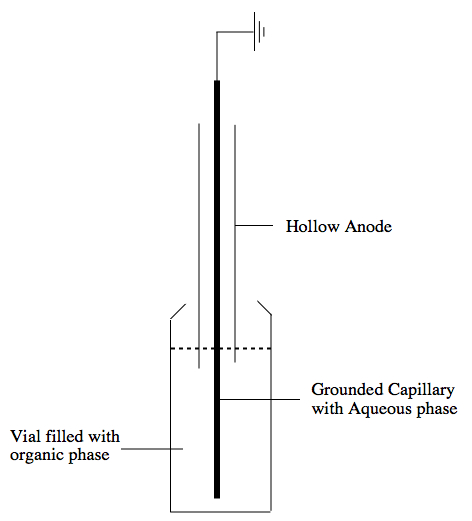
Figure 3. A diagram of a capillary electroextraction apparatus

Electroextraction (EE) is a sample enrichment technique that focuses charged analytes from a large volume of one phase into a small volume of aqueous phase through the application of an electric current. The technique was originally developed as a separation technique for chemical engineering, but has since been coupled to capillary electrophoresis and liquid chromatography–mass spectrometry as a means of improving limits of detection, analysis time, and selectivity. The use of EE-CE has made capillary electrophoresis more applicable to use in the pharmaceutical industry.

== Nomenclature ==
The term electroextraction is used to describe multiple processes. In this article, electroextraction describes the extraction of charged particles through a liquid phase barrier. The term can be used to describe electrowinning, which is the extraction of metals from their compounds via electrochemical processes. Electroextraction also describes a process of permeating bioproducts from a cell membrane using an electric field.

== Applications ==
=== Chemical engineering ===
Johann Stichlmair developed electroextraction at the University of Essen in Germany in 1987 as an improvement on liquid-liquid extraction in an electric field. Electric fields are applied to enhance the demixing of a sample in a two-phase system. However, as current flows through the system, the resulting convective mixing disrupts separation. Electroextraction corrects for this. Two or three liquid phases that are electrically conductive and immiscible with one another are kept between electrodes, and upon addition of an electric field, charged particles travel from one phase to another separating anions and cations. A two-phase system brings anions into one phase and cations into the other. A three phase system extracts anions and cations into the two outer phases while leaving uncharged particles in the middle phase. Convective mixing is restricted to each phase and does not travel between phases. A diagram is given in figure 1. Organic phases that are used typically have small amounts of water added in order to be conductive. Other possible phases include mixtures of water and highly polymerized substances, or water with non-ionic surfactants. Electroextraction has also influenced the development of similar electrophoretic separation techniques involving a membrane between the two-phase systems.

=== Analytical chemistry ===
The EE method was first applied to analytical chemistry by Van der Vlis in 1994. A diagram of an electroextraction apparatus is shown in figure 2. The apparatus consists of a vial with a conical bottom, a grounded platinum electrode, a capillary to inject the aqueous solution, and an adjustable gold anode with a circular bottom that contacts the entire organic phase.

EE is also often performed in a capillary electrophoresis capillary. This is referred to as capillary electroextraction, or cEE. In this set up, shown in figure 3, a capillary containing aqueous phase is placed in a vial of organic phase and surrounded by a hallow cathode. The outlet of the capillary is then grounded.

When EE is coupled to isotachophoresis coupled to capillary electrophoresis, limits of detection decrease to the nanomolar range and isotachophoresis takes only a few minutes to complete. Similar limits of detections are obtained when EE is coupled to liquid chromatography-mass spectrometry. Similar limits of detections are obtained when EE is coupled to liquid chromatography-mass spectrometry.

=== Biomedical ===
EE is ideal for pharmaceuticals with low concentrations of active ingredient, such as those containing proteins and peptides, because of its ability to lower limits of detection for liquid chromatography and capillary electrophoresis. In addition, sample enrichment by EE helps overcome the low injection volumes and short optical path length of UV-Vis detectors that accompany CE. EE coupled to CE has been used to separate and analyze antisense oligonucleotides. Antisense oligonucleotides inhibit protein expression from their complementary base pair sequence and can treat certain diseases and genetic disorders. EE coupled to liquid chromatography also successfully detects low concentration metabolites in urine for the purpose of studying metabolic processes. In addition, EE-ITP-CE has been used in the determination of the drugs clenbuterol, salbutamol, terbutaline, and fenoterol.

=== Dyestuffs ===
Electroextraction has been successfully employed in the separation of dyestuffs from wastewater. Electroextraction is better suited over other techniques for its ability to extract small amounts of dye from very dilute solutions. EE has also been effectively used in the separation of amino acids. This separation was done using an aqueous two-phase system of dextran-polyethylene glycol-water to stabilize the amino acids. The velocity of a particle crossing the phase barrier is directly proportional to the strength of the applied electric field, so 100% separation is achieved with a strong enough field.
