= Dextran 1,6-α-isomaltotriosidase =

Identifiers
- EC no.: 3.2.1.95
- CAS no.: 72561-11-6

Databases
- IntEnz: IntEnz view
- BRENDA: BRENDA entry
- ExPASy: NiceZyme view
- KEGG: KEGG entry
- MetaCyc: metabolic pathway
- PRIAM: profile
- PDB structures: RCSB PDB PDBe PDBsum
Search
- PMC: articles
- PubMed: articles
- NCBI: proteins

Dextran 1,6-α-isomaltotriosidase (EC 3.2.1.95, exo-isomaltotriohydrolase, 1,6-α-D-glucan isomaltotriohydrolase) is an enzyme with systematic name 6-α-D-glucan isomaltotriohydrolase. This enzyme catalyses the hydrolysis of (1→6)-α-D-glucosidic linkages in dextrans, to remove successive isomaltotriose units from the non-reducing ends of the chains.
