= Microcarrier =

A microcarrier is a support matrix that allows for the growth of adherent cells in bioreactors. Instead of on a flat surface, cells are cultured on the surface of spherical microcarriers so that each particle carries several hundred cells, and therefore expansion capacity can be multiplied several times over. It provides a straightforward way to scale up culture systems for industrial production of cell or protein-based therapies, or for research purposes.

These solid or porous spherical matrices range anywhere between 100-300 um in diameter to allow sufficient surface area while retaining enough cell adhesion and support, and their density is minimally above that of water (1 g/ml) so that they remain in suspension in a stirred tank. They can be composed of either synthetic materials such as acrylamide or natural materials such as gelatin.

The advantages of microcarrier technology in the biotech industry include (a) ease of scale-up, (b) ability to precisely control cell growth conditions in sophisticated, computer-controlled bioreactors, (c) an overall reduction in the floor space and incubator volume required for a given-sized manufacturing operation, (d) a drastic reduction in technician labor, and (e) a more natural environment for cell culture that promotes differentiation.

Human iPSCs cultured on microcarriers in a spinner flask.

== Microcarrier composition ==
=== Synthetic and natural microcarriers ===
There are several types of microcarriers that can be used, the selection of which is crucial for optimal performance for the application. Early in microcarrier development history, synthetic materials were overwhelmingly used, as they allowed for easy control of mechanical properties and reproducible results for the evaluation of their performance. These materials include DEAE-dextran, glass, polystyrene plastic, and acrylamide. In 1967, microcarrier development began when van Wezel found that the material could support the growth of anchorage-dependent cells, and he used diethylaminoethyl–Sephadex microcarriers. However, synthetic polymers prevent sufficient cell interactions with their environment and stunts their growth. Cells may not differentiate properly without feedback from their environment, and attachment levels would be low. Therefore, the second generation of microcarrier development involves use of natural polymers such as gelatin, collagen, chitin and its derivatives, and cellulose. Not only are these materials easily obtained, but the natural materials provide attachment sites for cells and a similar microenvironment that provides the cell signaling pathways necessary for their proper differentiation. Furthermore, as these are biocompatible, the resulting suspension can be used for delivery of cell therapies in vivo.

=== Solid and porous microcarriers ===
Although liquid microcarriers have been developed, a large majority of commercially available microcarriers are solid particles, synthesized through suspension polymerization. However, cells grown on solid microcarriers risk damage from external forces and collisions with other particles and the tank. Therefore, extra precaution must be taken on determining the stir speed and mechanism, so that the resulting fluid dynamic forces are not strong enough to adversely affect culture. The development of porous microcarriers greatly expanded the capabilities of this technology as it further increased the number of cells that the material can hold, but more importantly, it shielded those within the particle from external forces. These include drag and frictional forces of the suspension fluid, pressure gradients, and shear stresses. The 1980s were marked with a wave of microcarrier development with the breakthrough of porous particles.

=== Surface modifications ===
Microcarriers of the same material can differ in their porosity, specific gravity, optical properties, presence of animal components, and surface chemistries. Surface chemistries can include extracellular matrix proteins, functional groups, recombinant proteins, peptides, and positively or negatively charged molecules, added through conjugation, co-polymerization, plasma treatment or grafting. These may serve to provide higher attachment levels of the cells to the particles, provide a controlled release for isolation, or make the particles more thermally and physically resistant, among other reasons.

Several types of microcarriers are available commercially including alginate-based (GEM, Global Cell Solutions), dextran-based (Cytodex, GE Healthcare), collagen-based (Cultispher, Percell), and polystyrene-based (SoloHill Engineering) microcarriers.

Table 1. Commercially available microcarriers and their properties.
Name	Size (μm)	Density (g/mL)	Material
Cytodex-1	60–87	1.03	Dextran matrix with positively charged diethylaminoethyl groups throughout the matrix
Cytodex-2	60–87	1.04	Dextran matrix with N,N,N-trimethyl-2-hydroxyaminopropyl groups
Cytodex-3	60–87	1.04	Dextran beads coated with denatured porcine-skin collagen bound to surface
Cytopore 1	200–280	1.03	Cellulose
CultiSpher G	130–380	1.04	Cross-linked porcine gelatin
CultiSpher S	130–380	1.04	Cross-linked porcine gelatin
Hillex	150–210	1.1	Dextran matrix with treated surface
Glass coated	90–150	1.05	Glass

== Advantages over traditional cell culture ==
=== Expansion capacity ===
A prominent advantage in using microcarrier suspensions for the culture of cells over traditional two-dimensional plates is its capacity to hold more cells in smaller volumes. A hallmark of regular cell culture lab protocol is continual passaging as the cells reach confluence on plates fairly quickly, a bottleneck in biologics production. Multilayer vessels, stacked plates, hollow fibers, and packed bed reactors were other technologies developed to combat this capacity limit in plate cell culture. Although they were an improvement, cell numbers produced through these methods still did not reach the threshold for clinical applications. Microcarrier cell culture, however, was the breakthrough required for cell culture to reach industrial and clinical significance. Studies have shown that microcarrier suspensions, compared to multi-layer vessel culture, improve cell yield by 80-fold at only ten percent of Good Manufacturing Practice space, and only sixty percent of the original cost. Without the need for continual passaging, there is less risk of bacterial contamination and labor costs are minimized as well.

=== Homogeneity ===
Two-dimensional culture also suffers from poor diffusivity of nutrients and gases, requiring added media and supplements to be manually evenly distributed, and may result in irreproducible data. Microcarrier cell suspensions in stirred tank bioreactors allows for an even distribution through homogenous stirring. Parameters such as pH, oxygen pressure, and media supplement concentrations can be continually monitored within a bioreactor as opposed to manually testing small samples from plates. However, high stir speeds can cause damaging collisions between particles and against the reactor, and too low of a speed can inhibit cell growth by causing an accumulation of particles in a ‘dead zone’ and preventing an even distribution of essential nutrients. Therefore, a minimum and maximum velocity gradients must be calculated so as to keep the suspension homogeneous but also sheltered from unnecessary forces. Often the most efficient mechanism for this is an axial stirrer within the bioreactor, which allows for efficient mixing at minimal stir speeds. The homogenous nature of well-functioning bioreactors also allows for simple sampling and monitoring procedures, compared to two dimensional culture which often suffers from tedious sampling procedures.

=== Physiological microenvironment ===
Furthermore, the three-dimensional and high-density suspension environment promotes natural cell morphology and differentiation through mechanical stimulation. On the other hand, two-dimensional plate culture tends to de-differentiate cells over several passages and therefore total passage number must be limited.

=== Industrial translation ===
Microcarrier suspensions are also easily scaled up, through larger concentrations of microparticles in larger stirred tank reactors, while laboratory space used for culture can be still kept to a minimum. However, a scale-up of the microcarrier platform also entails certain challenges in the downstream production process. This includes a reworking of the cell detachment and isolation processes. Larger volumes of suspension liquid must be removed from larger vats of bioreactors, and therefore more equipment must be purchased to handle tens to hundreds of liters of solution instead of the standard milliliter.

=== Biocompatibility ===
Microcarriers are being investigated to deliver cells for targeted tissue engineering. Hepatocytes, chondrocytes, fibroblasts and more have been successfully delivered using biocompatible microcarriers to in vivo targets for the repair of damaged tissues. Microcarriers can also be used to deliver small molecules and proteins for the same purpose.

== Application ==
A liquid-based assembly method was developed by P. Chen et al. for assembling cell-seeded microcarriers into diverse structures. Neuron-seeded microcarriers were assembled for formation of 3D neural networks with controlled global shape. This method is potentially useful for tissue engineering and neuroscience.
