= OSU-03012 =

Names
- IUPAC name 2-Amino-N-[4-[5-phenanthren-2-yl-3-(trifluoromethyl)pyrazol-1-yl]phenyl]acetamide
- Other names AR-12

Identifiers
| CAS Number | 742112-33-0 |
| 3D model (JSmol) | Interactive image |
| ChEBI | CHEBI:131196 |
| ChemSpider | 8202849 |
| IUPHAR/BPS | 8005 |
| PubChem CID | 10027278 |
| UNII | EX3O2Q61UV |
| CompTox Dashboard (EPA) | DTXSID50225206 |
- InChI: InChI=1S/C26H19F3N4O/c27-26(28,29)24-14-23(33(32-24)20-10-8-19(9-11-20)31-25(34)15-30)18-7-12-22-17(13-18)6-5-16-3-1-2-4-21(16)22/h1-14H,15,30H2,(H,31,34) Key: YULUCECVQOCQFQ-UHFFFAOYSA-N; InChI=1/C26H19F3N4O/c27-26(28,29)24-14-23(33(32-24)20-10-8-19(9-11-20)31-25(34)15-30)18-7-12-22-17(13-18)6-5-16-3-1-2-4-21(16)22/h1-14H,15,30H2,(H,31,34) Key: YULUCECVQOCQFQ-UHFFFAOYAU
- SMILES: C1=CC=C2C(=C1)C=CC3=C2C=CC(=C3)C4=CC(=NN4C5=CC=C(C=C5)NC(=O)CN)C(F)(F)F

Properties
| Chemical formula | C_{26}H_{19}F_{3}N_{4}O |
| Molar mass | 460.460 g·mol^{−1} |
- Except where otherwise noted, data are given for materials in their standard state (at 25 °C [77 °F], 100 kPa). Infobox references

OSU-03012 (AR-12) is a celecoxib derivative with anticancer and anti-microbial activity. Unlike celecoxib, OSU-03012 does not inhibit COX, but inhibits several other important enzymes instead which may be useful in the treatment of some forms of cancer. When combined with PDE5 inhibitors such as sildenafil or tadalafil, OSU-03012 was found to show enhanced anti-tumour effects in cell culture. OSU-03012 has been shown to inhibit completely vaccinia virus in cell based assay.

== Antimicrobial agent ==
- Antifungal activity against Candida albicans, non-albicans Candida spp., Cryptococcus neoformans, Blastomyces dermatitidis, Histoplasma, and Coccidioides via disruption of phosphoinositide-dependent kinase-1 and inhibition of acetyl—CoA synthetase activity. Activity was enhanced with fluconazole co-delivery.
- Antiparasitic activity against Leishmania donovani.
- Antibacterial activity against Salmonella enterica, and Francisella tularensis. OSU-03012 has also illustrated sensitization of intracellular Salmonella enterica to aminoglycosides.
- Antiviral when combined with PDE5 inhibitors such as sildenafil or tadalafil against a wide variety of organisms including Lassa virus, Marburg virus, and Ebola virus. This activity thought to be mediated via inhibition of the chaperone protein BiP.

Antimicrobial activity is often not against the microbe directly (like conventional antibiotics), but rather host-directed activity that works on the cellular host to disrupt the pathogen within the cell. Since the median lethal dose (LD_{50}), in vitro, against macrophages is ~7 μM and near its effective concentration (EC50) formulation of the compound has been shown to enhances its activity. For example, encapsulation of OSU-03012 into biodegradable polymeric (Acetalated dextran) micro/nanoparticles significantly reduces cytotoxicity, increases drug concentration per a cell, reduces toxicity in vivo, and facilitates needle-free delivery in vivo.

== Orphan drug designation ==
The European Commission has designated OSU-03012 as an orphan drug for use in combination with other drugs for treatment of two infections diseases, cryptococcosis and tularaemia. OSU-03012 received an orphan drug designation in combination with the antifungal drug fluconazole for cryptococcosis of the brain. It also received this designation for tularaemia in combination with the antibacterial drug gentamicin.
