= Tobacco BY-2 cells =

Plant cell

Tobacco BY-2 cells is a cell line of plant cells, which was established from a callus induced on a seedling of Nicotiana tabacum cv. BY-2 (cultivar Bright Yellow - 2 of the tobacco plant).

== Overview ==
Tobacco BY-2 cells are nongreen, fast growing plant cells which can multiply their numbers up to 100-fold within one week in adequate culture medium (such as Murashige and Skoog medium) and good culture conditions. This cultivar of tobacco is kept as a cell culture and more specifically as cell suspension culture (a specialized population of cells growing in liquid medium, they are raised by scientists in order to study a specific biological property of a plant cell). In cell suspension cultures, each of the cells is floating independently or at most only in short chains in a culture medium. Each of the cells has similar properties to the others. The model plant system is comparable to HeLa cells for human research. Because the organism is relatively simple and predictable it makes the study of biological processes easier, and can be an intermediate step towards understanding more complex organisms. They are used by plant physiologists and molecular biologists as a model organism.

They are used as model systems for higher plants because of their relatively high homogeneity and high growth rate, featuring still general behaviour of plant cell. The diversity of cell types within any part of a naturally grown plant (in vivo) makes it very difficult to investigate and understand some general biochemical phenomena of living plant cells. The transport of a solute in or out of the cell, for example, is difficult to study because the specialized cells in a multicellular organism behave differently. Cell suspension cultures such as tobacco BY-2 provide good model systems for these studies at the level of a single cell and its compartments because tobacco BY-2 cells behave very similarly to one another. The influence of neighbouring cells behavior is in the suspension is not as important as it would be in an intact plant. As a result any changes observed after a stimulus is applied can be statistically correlated and it could be decided if these changes are reactions to the stimulus or just merely coincidental. In this moment BY-2 cells are relatively well understood and often used in research. This model plant system is especially useful for studies of cell division, cytoskeletons, plant hormone signaling, intracellular trafficking, and organelle differentiation.
