= Branched-dextran exo-1,2-alpha-glucosidase =

Branched-dextran exo-1,2-α-glucosidase

Identifiers
- EC no.: 3.2.1.115
- CAS no.: 72840-94-9

Databases
- IntEnz: IntEnz view
- BRENDA: BRENDA entry
- ExPASy: NiceZyme view
- KEGG: KEGG entry
- MetaCyc: metabolic pathway
- PRIAM: profile
- PDB structures: RCSB PDB PDBe PDBsum
Search
- PMC: articles
- PubMed: articles
- NCBI: proteins

Branched-dextran exo-1,2-α-glucosidase (EC 3.2.1.115, dextran 1,2-α-glucosidase, dextran α-1,2 debranching enzyme, 1,2-α-D-glucosyl-branched-dextran 2-glucohydrolase) is an enzyme with systematic name (1→2)-α-D-glucosyl-branched-dextran 2-glucohydrolase. It catalyses the hydrolysis of (1→2)-α-D-glucosidic linkages at the branch points of dextrans and related polysaccharides, producing free D-glucose.

This enzyme does not hydrolyse disaccharides or oligosaccharides containing linear 1,2-α-glucosidic linkages.
