= Host-directed therapeutics =

Host-directed therapeutics, also called host targeted therapeutics, act via a host-mediated response to pathogens rather than acting directly on the pathogen, like traditional antibiotics. They can change the local environment in which the pathogen exists to make it less favorable for the pathogen to live and/or grow. With these therapies, pathogen killing, e.g.bactericidal effects, will likely only occur when it is co-delivered with a traditional agent that acts directly on the pathogen, such as an antibiotic, antifungal, or antiparasitic agent. Several antiviral agents are host-directed therapeutics, and simply slow the virus progression rather than kill the virus. Host-directed therapeutics may limit pathogen proliferation, e.g., have bacteriostatic effects. Certain agents also have the ability to reduce bacterial load by enhancing host cell responses even in the absence of traditional antimicrobial agents.

== Types ==
=== Immunomodulatory ===
Intracellular pathogens often reside in immune cells like macrophages. These pathogens can be obligate or facultative intracellular pathogens. Changing the innate immune response of these host-cells can alter the pathogen's ability to live inside the cell. Many of these immunomodulatory host-directed therapies are adjuvants or pathogen-associated molecular patterns. They can include Toll-like receptors (TLRs), NOD-like receptors (NLRs), C-type lectin receptors (CLRs), mannose receptor (MR), dendritic cell-specific intracellular adhesion molecule 3 (ICAM3)-grabbing nonintegrin (DC-SIGN), complement receptors, Fc receptors, and DNA sensors (e.g., STING). Epithelial cells also host pathogens, like Salmonella enterica. These immunomodulatory agents can also alter the epithelial cell environments, since they also have a role in innate signalling.

=== Enhanced host cell function ===
Autophagy modulators are one type of method to enhance host cell functions. Pathogens like Mycobacterium tuberculosis (MTB), will be degraded in the autophagosome during an effective host response that will clear the bacteria. Because bacteria and other pathogens like MTB can take over cellular responses like autophagy, they can increase their survival in the body. By reactivating effective autophagy processes the pathogen could be cleared. Examples of this has been shown with MTB, and Listeria monocytogenes. OSU-03012 is thought to modulate autophagy in its effect on Salmonella enterica, and Francisella tularensis.

=== Pathology modification ===
Modifying lung and macrophage pathology has been shown to have a role in the host-directed therapies for MTB.
