= Confluency =

In cell culture biology, confluence refers to the percentage of the surface of a culture dish that is covered by adherent cells. For example, 50 percent confluence means roughly half of the surface is covered, while 100 percent confluence means the surface is completely covered by the cells, and no more room is left for the cells to grow as a monolayer. The cell number refers to, trivially, the number of cells in a given region.

== Impact on research ==
Many cell lines exhibit differences in growth rate or gene expression depending on the degree of confluence. Cells are typically passaged before becoming fully confluent in order to maintain their proliferation phenotype. Some cell types are not limited by contact inhibition, such as immortalized cells, and may continue to divide and form layers on top of the parent cells. To achieve optimal and consistent results, experiments are usually performed using cells at a particular confluence, depending on the cell type. Extracellular export of cell free material is also dependent on the cell confluence .

== Estimation ==
=== Rule of thumb ===
Comparing the amount of space covered by cells with unoccupied space using the naked eye can provide a rough estimate of confluency.

=== Hemocytometer ===
A hemocytometer can be used to count cells, giving the cell number.
