= Mississippi School for Mathematics and Science =

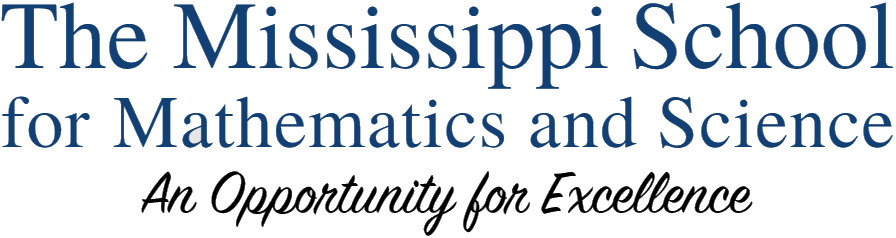

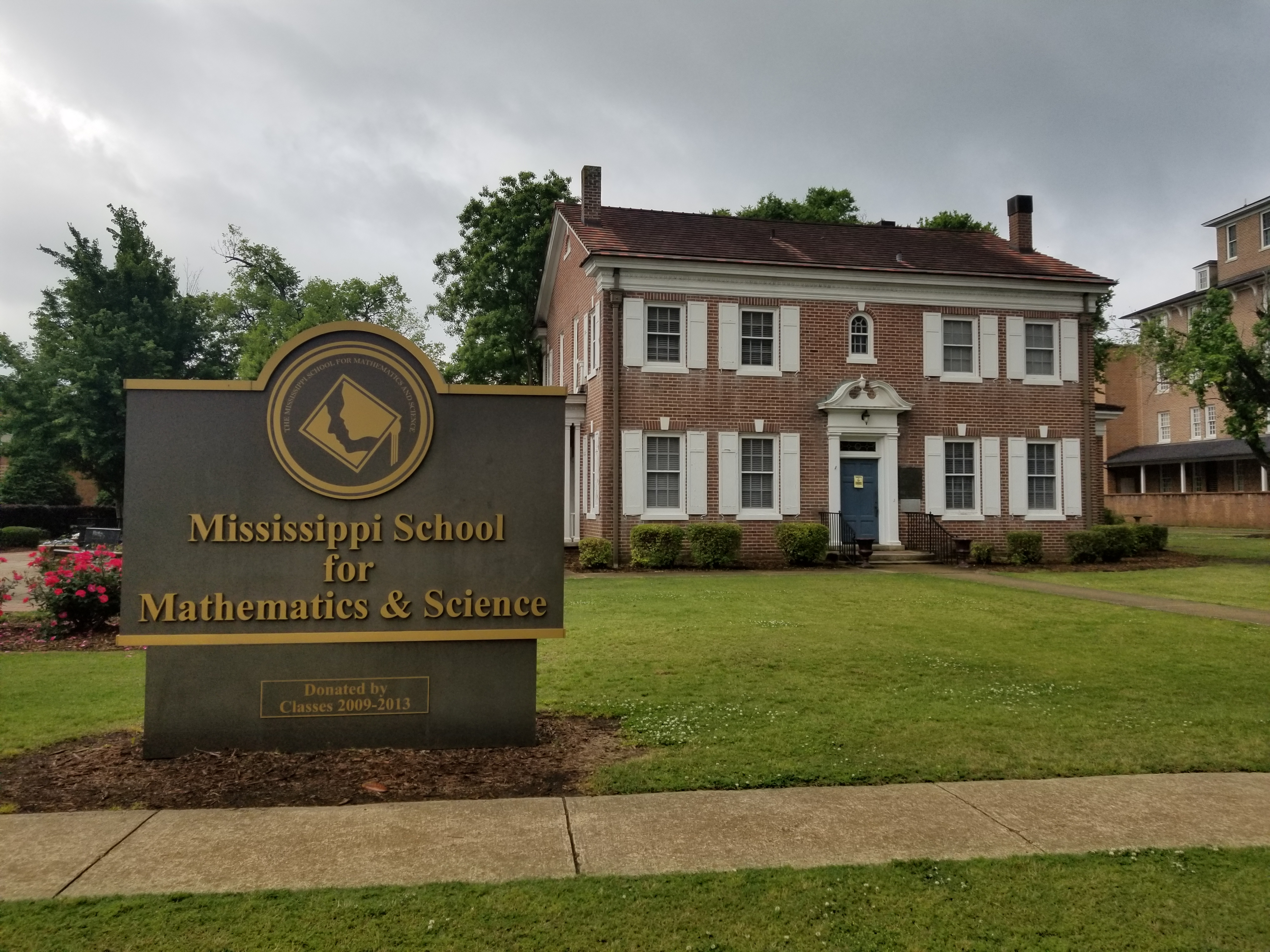
- Admin offices and sign

Location
- Columbus, Mississippi 39701; United States; 33.491597°N 88.417778°W

Information
- Type: Residential public high school
- Established: 1987; 39 years ago
- NCES District ID: 2801194
- NCES School ID: 280119401201
- Executive Director: Ginger Tedder
- Grades: 11–12
- Gender: Coeducational
- Enrollment: 220 (approx.)
- Colors: (Navy blue and white)
- Nickname: Blue Waves
- Accreditation: AdvancED
- Affiliations: NCSSS
- Website: themsms.org

The Mississippi School for Mathematics and Science (MSMS) is a statewide public magnet school and Mississippi's only public residential high school for academically gifted students. It is in Columbus, Mississippi, United States, on the campus of the Mississippi University for Women. A member of the National Consortium for Secondary STEM Schools,

Tenth-grade students are selected to attend through a competitive application process that includes standardized test scores, a written application, and an interview. The school enrolls students in the last two years of high school graduating over 100 students each year. The school produced 16 2026 National Merit Semifinalists. While the main academic focus of MSMS is mathematics and science, humanities, particularly history, literature, and art are also emphasized. In 2025, 2 students were named Mississippi Lions All-State Band Members.

== History ==
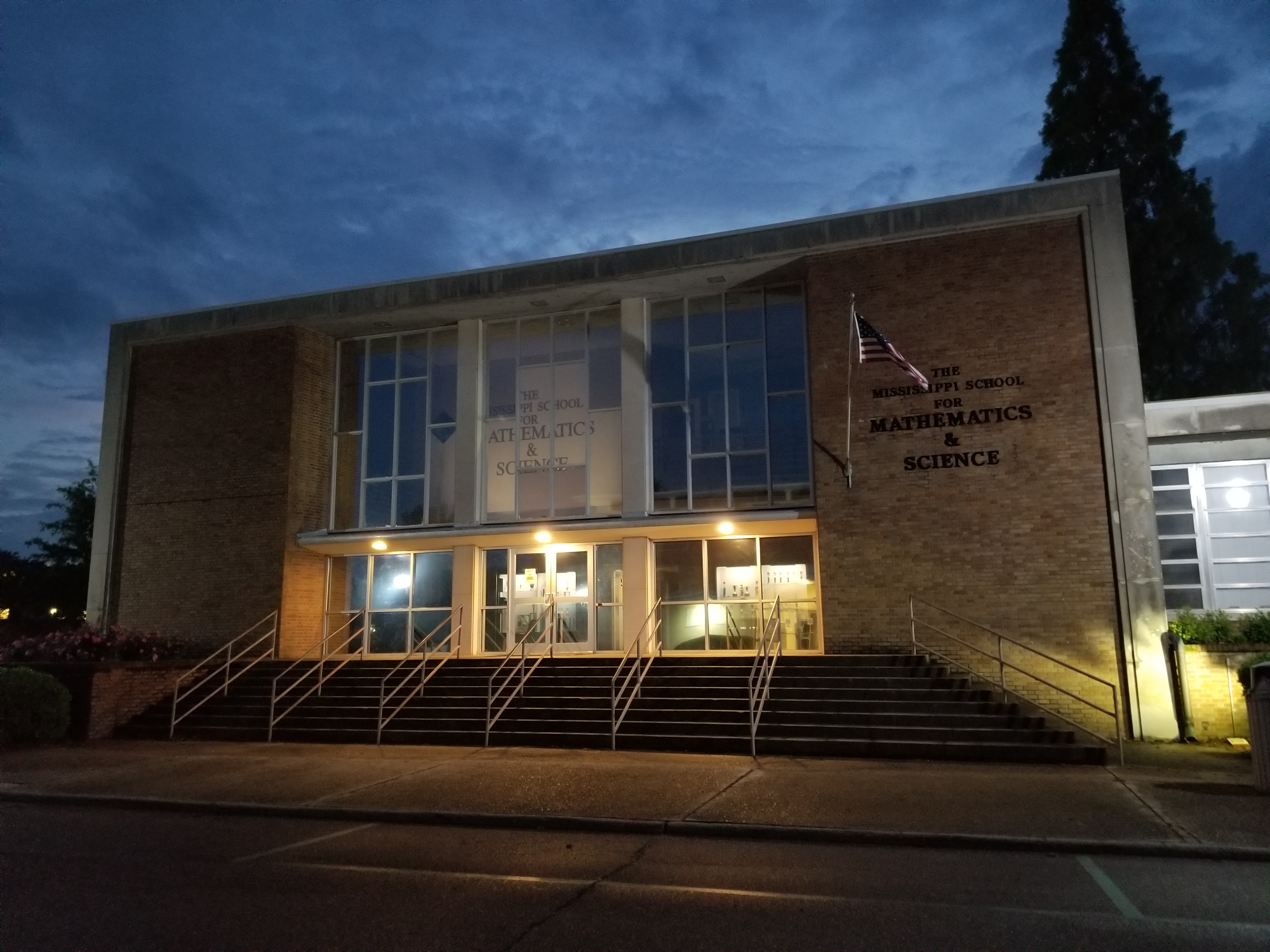
Hooper Science Building

Mississippi School for Mathematics and Science was founded in 1987 by appropriations from the Mississippi Legislature and was the fourth public, residential high school for academically gifted students created in the United States.

As a public, residential high school, drawing students from all over the state, MSMS has occasionally struggled for existence. The property tax has been the sole form of finance for most schools in Mississippi. However, MSMS which draws students from all over the state, cannot levy a millage tax as a source of funding. It relies on grants as well as state, student, and alumni contributions.

Starting in 2008, the Mississippi Legislature required MSMS and its sister school, the Mississippi School of the Arts, to charge students $500 per semester for room and board costs, making them the only public schools in the state that charge students to attend. However, if a student is eligible for free or reduced lunch in their home district, then this fee is waived.

During the COVID-19 pandemic, MSMS transitioned to an online-learning environment, beginning at the end of March 2020, using Zoom and other telecommunications services. During the 2020–2021 academic year, the school utilized a hybrid learning environment, allowing some students to remain virtual while others attended in-person classes and lived on campus with quarantining restrictions.

== Notable alumni ==
- Elizabeth Wayne, TED Fellow
