= Kristy M. Ainslie =

Pharmaceutical science professor

- Citizenship: USA
- Education: Pennsylvania State University, Michigan State University
- Scientific career
- Fields: Engineering, Pharmacy
- Doctoral advisor: Michael Pishko
- Other academic advisors: Tejal A. Desai, John Tarbell
- Website: ainslielab.web.unc.edu

Kristy M. Ainslie is a Fred Eshelman Distinguished Professor and Director of Emerging Educational Programs in the Pharmaceutical Sciences in pharmaceutical science at University of North Carolina at Chapel Hill in the Eshelman School of Pharmacy and former chair of the Division of Pharmacoengineering and Molecular Pharmaceutics. She is also joint in the UNC School of Medicine Department of Microbiology and Immunology and affiliated faculty in the UNC/NC State joint Biomedical Engineering department. Additionally, she is part of UNC's Biological and Biomedical Sciences Program (BBSP). She is co-founder of the company IMMvention Therapeutix and Immune Foundry Labs.

Ainslie serves on the editorial boards of iPharma, Journal of Controlled Release, and International Journal of Pharmaceutics.

== Background ==
Ainslie earned degrees in chemical engineering from Michigan State University, and the Pennsylvania State University College of Engineering. Her early research focused on mechanobiology, nanomaterials, and drug delivery. She previously held a faculty appointment at Ohio State University and currently holds positions at the University of North Carolina at Chapel Hill.

== Career ==
Ainslie's research focuses on polymer-based drug delivery systems, particularly acetalated dextran, for applications in vaccines, immunotherapy, and infectious disease. Her laboratory has developed acetalated dextran variants with tunable degradation rates and release properties, as well as microparticle and nanofiber formulations for the controlled delivery of antigens, adjuvants, and other therapeutics.

She has received National Institutes of Health funding since 2011 to develop antigen-specific immunotherapies for multiple sclerosis and type 1 diabetes intended to induce immune tolerance rather than broadly suppress the immune system, as well as biomaterial-based drug delivery scaffolds for glioblastoma.

In 2026, Ainslie became lead investigator on National Institutes of Health Program Project grant P01 CA298971, a multi-institutional award to develop biomaterial approaches for enhancing chimeric antigen receptor T-cell and CAR-NKT cell therapies for glioblastoma, involving collaborators from the UNC Lineberger Comprehensive Cancer Center, the UNC School of Medicine, and the University of Colorado School of Medicine.

== Awards and Honors ==
- 2007: Controlled Release Society–Capsugel Post-Doc Award for Innovative Aspects of Oral Drug Delivery & Absorption.
- 2009: Controlled Release Society Outstanding Oral Drug Delivery Award.
- 2012: James M. Siddens Distinguished Faculty Advising Award, Ohio State University Council of Graduate Students.
- 2021: Elected Fellow of the American Institute for Medical and Biological Engineering.
- 2022: Inducted into the Controlled Release Society College of Fellows.
- 2023: Sato Memorial International Award.
