= Dextran drug delivery systems =

Polymeric drug carrier

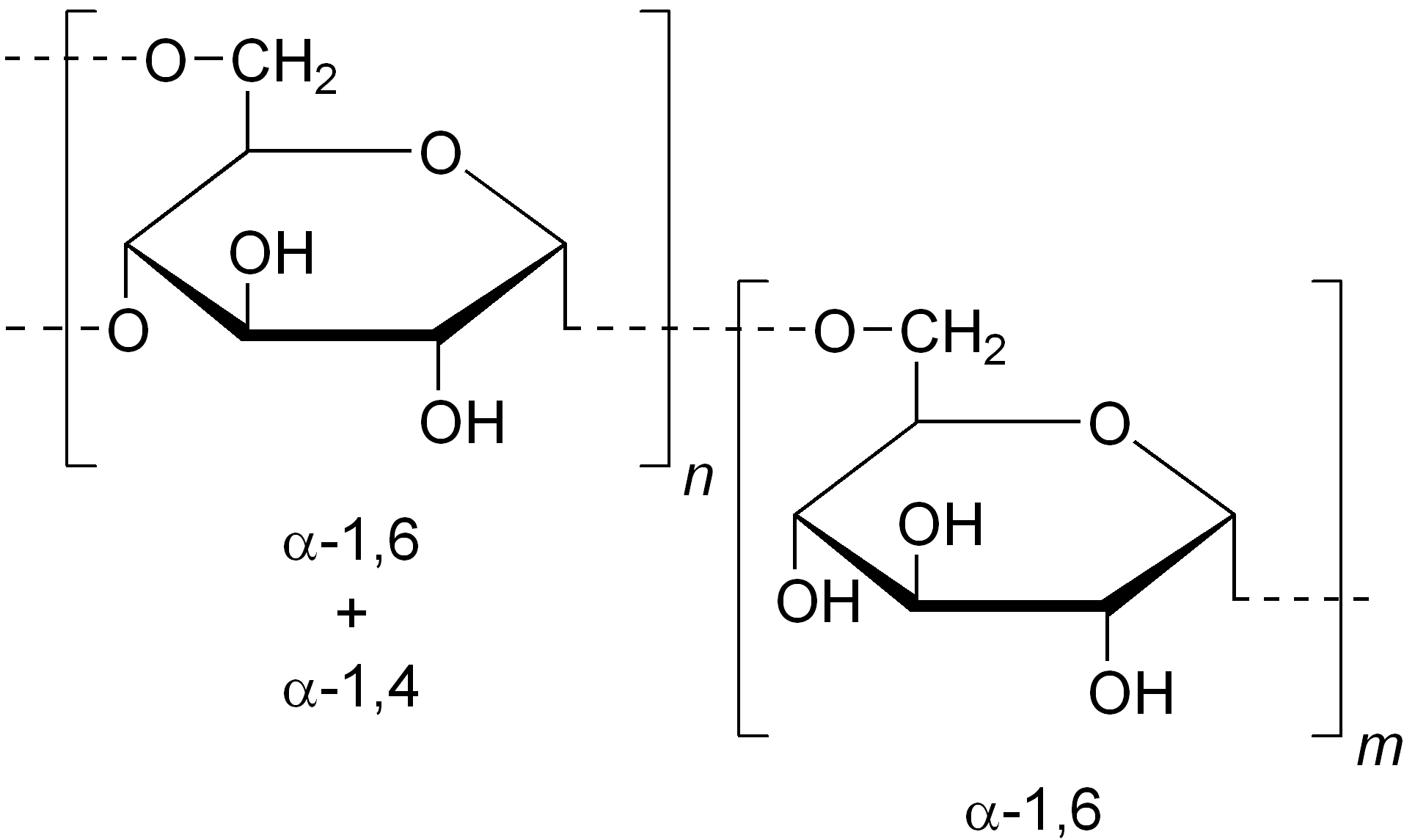
Chemical structure of dextran

Dextran drug delivery systems involve the use of the natural glucose polymer dextran in applications as a prodrug, nanoparticle, microsphere, micelle, and hydrogel drug carrier in the field of targeted and controlled drug delivery. According to several in vitro and animal research studies, dextran carriers reduce off-site toxicity and improve local drug concentration at the target tissue site. This technology has significant implications as a potential strategy for delivering therapeutics to treat cancer, cardiovascular diseases, pulmonary diseases, bone diseases, liver diseases, colonic diseases, infections, and HIV.

Although there are many FDA approved natural polymeric-based drug carriers available for clinical use, dextran has failed to obtain any clinical applications. Research must address several challenges and obstacles associated with dextran before it can become a viable, clinically approved drug delivery strategy.

== Characterization ==
Dextran has many favorable properties that make it an ideal candidate for applications as a drug delivery system. As a natural polymer, dextran is biocompatible and biodegradable in the human body. Dextran can also be chemically modified to produce derivatives at a low cost, which can address a few of the undesirable characteristics including its low mechanical strength and uncontrollable hydration rate [4]. This natural glucose polymer has excellent water solubility and prolonged circulation in the blood as well.

== Dextran prodrug ==
Dextran prodrugs are chemically linked drug-polymer complexes in which enzymatic processes and hydrolysis in vivo cause the drug to become pharmacologically active. Therapeutic agents can be linked to dextran via an ester bond which can be hydrolyzed slowly by esterases to produce sustained, stable drug release. Drug-dextran complexes can also be formed by chemical linkage through an amide bond, which is hydrolyzed by amidase. Prodrugs coupled by amide bonds provide much slower drug release than by ester bonds. Succinic acid and glutaric acid carboxyl groups, amino acids, pH and reductivity sensitive disulfide bonds, and click chemistry are also methods of coupling drugs to dextran.

=== Dextran prodrug applications ===
These drug-polymer complexes have advantages such as longer drug half-life and improved targeted drug delivery. Dextran prodrugs have potential applications in the treatment of liver diseases, pulmonary diseases, colonic diseases, and cancer.

== Dextran nanoparticles ==
Dextran nanoparticles are 1-100 nm sized particles with drug encapsulation capability. The high surface area of these nanoparticles allows more drugs to be loaded and encapsulated, leading to higher drug concentrations at the target site. The small size of these particles also encourages cellular uptake, which makes dextran nanoparticles a potential effective drug delivery system for targeting tumor cells.

=== Dextran-coated nanoparticles ===
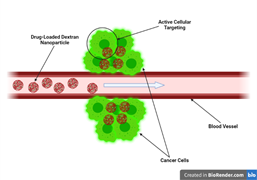
Drug-loaded dextran nanoparticles

Dextran has indirect applications in nanoparticles as a coating. Iron oxide nanoparticles coated with dextran can be loaded with the microRNA miR-29a to selectively target breast cancer cells and down-regulate anti-apoptotic genes leading to successful breast cancer treatment. Dextran-coated iron oxide nanoparticles loaded with heparinase-like antisense nucleic acid effectively target uterine cancer cells and inhibit tumor growth. Supermagnetic nanospheres composed of iron oxide coated with dextran can be loaded with doxorubicin to effectively target tumor cells and limit off-site toxicity. Gold magnetic nanoparticles coated with dextran can effectively target desired tissue sites with the aid of an externally applied magnetic field. Dextran coatings can further improve the drug targeting capability of other types of nanoparticles.

=== Dextran conjugate nanoparticles ===
Dextran conjugates are also utilized in nanoparticle drug delivery system formulations. Nanoparticles composted of dextran and stearic acid with a polyethylene glycol (PEG) coating can be loaded with antiviral drugs and be effectively internalized by cells. This nanosystem has the advantages of providing protection against immune responses and providing stability to the encapsulated drug. This technology has applications in the treatment of HIV and AIDS. Dextran can be grafted with folic acid to develop doxorubicin-loaded nanoparticles. Dextran-folic acid nanoparticles effectively target tumors, reduce off-site toxicity, and prolong blood circulation. Dextran-spermine nanoparticles loaded with doxorubicin can achieve targeted and sustained drug release in tumors.

=== Dextran nanoparticle applications ===
Dextran nanoparticles have advantages such as increased drug-loading capacity, improved cellular uptake, reduce off-site toxicity, and increase local drug concentrations at the target tissue site. The current research indicates that dextran nanoparticles can potentially have applications in the delivery of anti-tumor therapeutics.

== Dextran microspheres ==
Dextran microspheres are 1 to 250 micrometer sized polymeric particles that can encapsulate drugs. Microspheres composed of dextran have several advantages as a drug delivery system including controlled drug release, localized drug concentration, and reduced adverse reactions. Controlled drug release by these dextran microparticles is achieved by degradation, which is the breakdown of chemical bonds in the molecular structure of the polymeric network. Dextran microspheres are formulated in many forms including native dextran, dextran as a cross-linker, dextran conjugates, and chemically modified dextran.

=== Dextran microspheres ===
Dextran can be used as a standalone material in microspheres. Dextran microspheres can provide controlled drug release in gastric and intestinal pH environments, which is ideal for targeting of the colon.

=== Dextran-crosslinked microspheres ===
One application of the glucose polymer dextran in microsphere compositions is as a cross-linker. Dextran and oxidized dextran can be used to crosslink gelatin microspheres to reduce gelatin dissolution, which slows the drug release rate. These dextran/gelatin microspheres can be used to provide slow-release of TRAPP-Br, which is a cancer therapeutic. Hydrogel microspheres synthesized by using porous chitosan polyelectrolyte complex with dextran sulfate as a cross-linker can deliver hydrophobic drugs to the intestines with high efficacy.

=== Dextran conjugate microspheres ===
Dextran can be conjugated with other materials to synthesize microspheres. Dextran grafted with PLGA forms microspheres that can provide effective delivery of insulin in diabetic patients. Dextran/chitosan microspheres efficiently deliver recombinant bone morphogenic protein (rhBMP-2) for the treatment of bone diseases.

=== Chemically modified dextran microspheres ===
Microspheres can also be developed by chemically modifying dextran. Acetated dextran can be modified with amine groups and grafted with heparin to form microspheres that provide protamine-stimulated, targeted drug release for the delivery of therapeutics to treat cardiovascular diseases. Dextran modified with an octyl- group creates microspheres that provide extended release of doxorubicin, which is an antitumor therapeutic.

=== Dextran microsphere applications ===
Dextran-based microspheres can encapsulate a variety of drugs and provide therapeutic delivery in the treatment of diseases such as cancer, colonic diseases, bone diseases, and cardiovascular diseases.

== Dextran micelles ==
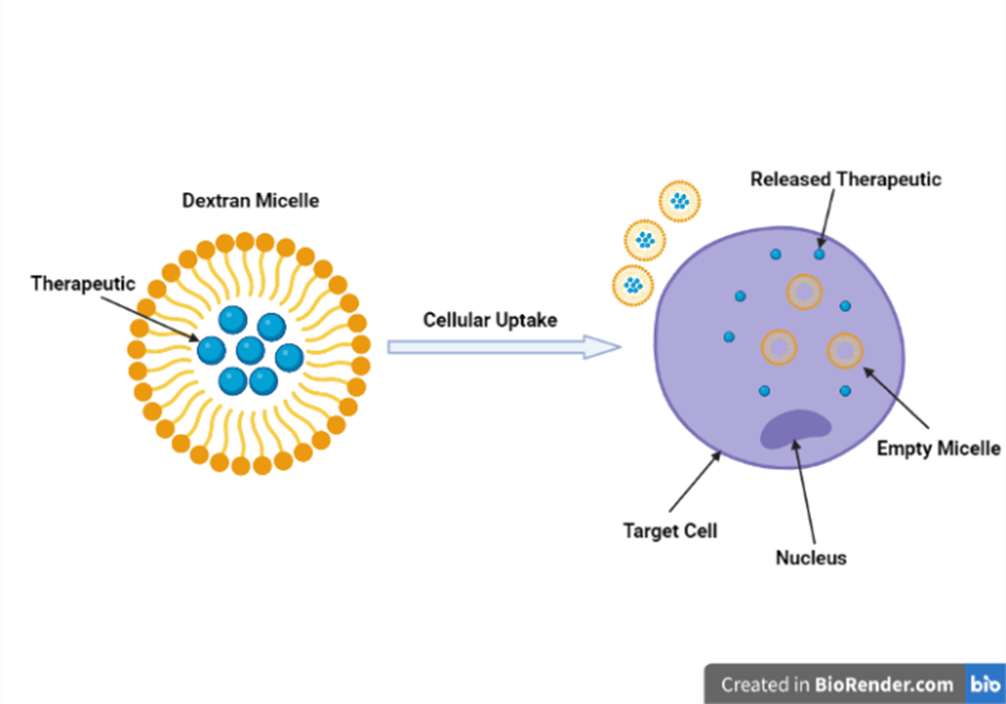
Drug-loaded dextran micelle

Dextran micelles are 10 to 100 nm sized amphiphilic polymeric particles which have the advantages of avoiding drug clearance by the kidneys and traveling through blood vessels. The core of these micelles are hydrophobic, allowing for loading of hydrophobic drugs into the micelle. The outer shell of the particles is hydrophilic, which allows for long circulation times in the blood. Dextran can be conjugated with other materials to form polymeric micelles including stearic acid and cholesterol to further improve sustained release of the loaded hydrophobic drug. The size of the micelles can be controlled by altering the ratio of stearic acid to dextran. Dextran micelles can also be formed from conjugation with polycaprolactone, folic acid, retinoic acid, and PLGA.

=== Stimuli-responsive dextran micelles ===
Dextran micelles can be synthesized and modified to be stimuli-responsive. These stimuli include pH, temperature, and redox conditions. Micelles composed of dextran grafted with deoxycholic acid or polycaprolactone via a disulfide bond are responsive to a redox environment. Dextran micelles conjugated with cholesterol exhibit pH responsiveness when modified with histidine. Dextran-benzimidazole conjugate micelles also exhibit pH-responsiveness. When the polymeric micelles encounter these stimuli, release of the drug from the hydrophobic core is triggered by various mechanisms depending on the stimuli and the conjugated material. Stimuli-responsive dextran grafted micelles decrease off-site drug toxicity and increase localized drug concentration in the target site.

=== Dextran micelle applications ===
Dextran micelles and dextran copolymer micelles can be loaded with a variety of hydrophobic drugs such as doxorubicin, rapamycin, and paclitaxel, indicating a significant application in the delivery of anti-cancer therapeutics.

== Dextran hydrogels ==
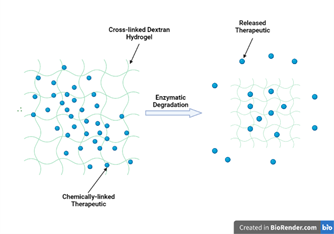
Drug-loaded dextran cross-linked hydrogel

Dextran hydrogels and dextran conjugate hydrogels are heavily cross-linked polymeric networks that have a strong affinity for water. These gels have soft, elastic physical properties and are biocompatible and biodegradable. Dextran hydrogels have also been shown to be stable and safe in vivo. Glucose-based polymeric gels have the advantage of being able to be chemically or physically modified to improve targeted drug delivery. Swelling is one mechanism by which drugs are released from the dextran hydrogels. Swelling can be reduced by increasing the molecular weight of dextran, leading to a slower drug diffusion rate out of the hydrogel. Swelling can also be lessened by increasing the amount of the conjugated species and introducing ethanol during the cross-linking reaction. Degradation of chemical linkages in the dextran hydrogels is another mechanism by which drugs are released from the polymeric matrices. An increase in degradation of the dextran hydrogel leads to an increase in drug release rate. Degradation of dextran hydrogels specifically is caused by dextranases, which are microbial enzymes mostly located in the colon.

=== Dextran hydrogel colon-targeting ===
The colon is an ideal target for dextran hydrogel drug delivery systems due to the presence of dextranases. Dextran can be cross-linked with diisocyanate to form a hydrogel that can be loaded with hydrocortisone to treat swelling or inflammation in the colon. Hydrogels can also be synthesized from crosslinking epichlorohydrin (ECH) with dextran. Dextran-ECH hydrogels can be loaded with salmon calcitonin (sCT) to treat bone diseases. Dextran-ECH hydrogels loaded with sCT achieved comparable release rates to other polymeric hydrogels in the colon.

=== Other dextran hydrogel targeted sites ===
Dextran conjugate hydrogels can also target other desirable sites. Paclitaxel-loaded dextran-sericin hydrogels can effectively target tumor growth in mice. Hydrogels composed of translocator protein (TSPO) ligands conjugated to dextran have the potential to induce apoptosis in tumor cells via the TSPO receptor on the mitochondria. Dextran/polyacrylamide hydrogels with covalently bound silver nanoparticles can effectively release ornidazole to treat infections. Dextran conjugated with oligolactide chains through a disulfide bond can form hydrogels that have potential applications in cancer treatment drug delivery systems. Dextran hydrogels that release drugs in response to an external electrical field can also be synthesized.

=== Dextran hydrogel applications ===
Dextran hydrogel and dextran conjugate hydrogel drug delivery systems have a variety of applications. These gels can be used to release therapeutics to treat cancer, swelling, inflammation, bone diseases, and infections.

== Clinical translation ==
Dextran has yet to be approved for any clinical uses in drug delivery due to a wide variety of limitations including heterogeneity, undesirable side effects, and unknown biological pathways. Changes in the molecular weight of dextran have been shown to alter biological activity, indicating a need for separation and purification processes to ensure batch homogeneity. Dextran, although considered relatively safe and nontoxic in vivo, exhibits a few side effects with the most notable being thrombocytopenia and liver toxicity. The exact biological mechanisms by which dextran-based drug delivery systems act on the drug target must be elucidated as well. Dextran-based drug delivery systems have an enormous potential for clinical use in the treatment of a variety of disease states.
