= Osmotic stress technique =

The osmotic stress technique is a method for measuring the effect of water on biological molecules, particularly enzymes. Just as the properties of molecules can depend on the presence of salts, pH, and temperature, they can depend significantly on the amount of water present. In the osmotic stress technique, flexible neutral polymers such as polyethylene glycol and dextran are added to the solution containing the molecule of interest, replacing a significant part of the water. The amount of water replaced is characterized by the chemical activity of water.

== See also ==
- Osmotic shock
