= Suspension culture =

Type of cell culture

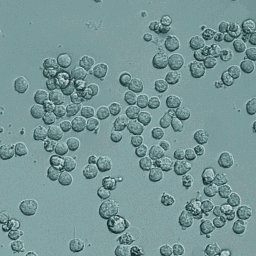
CHO cells in suspension

A cell suspension or suspension culture is a type of cell culture in which single cells or small aggregates of cells are allowed to function and multiply in an agitated growth medium, thus forming a suspension. Suspension culture is one of the two classical types of cell culture, the other being adherent culture. The history of suspension cell culture closely aligns with the history of cell culture overall, but differs in maintenance methods and commercial applications. The cells themselves can either be derived from homogenized tissue or from heterogenous cell solutions. Suspension cell culture is commonly used to culture nonadhesive cell lines like hematopoietic cells, plant cells, and insect cells. While some cell lines are cultured in suspension, the majority of commercially available mammalian cell lines are adherent. Suspension cell cultures must be agitated to maintain cells in suspension, and may require specialized equipment (e.g. magnetic stir plate, orbital shakers, incubators) and flasks (e.g. culture flasks, spinner flasks, shaker flasks). These cultures need to be maintained with nutrient containing media and cultured in a specific cell density range to avoid cell death.

== History ==
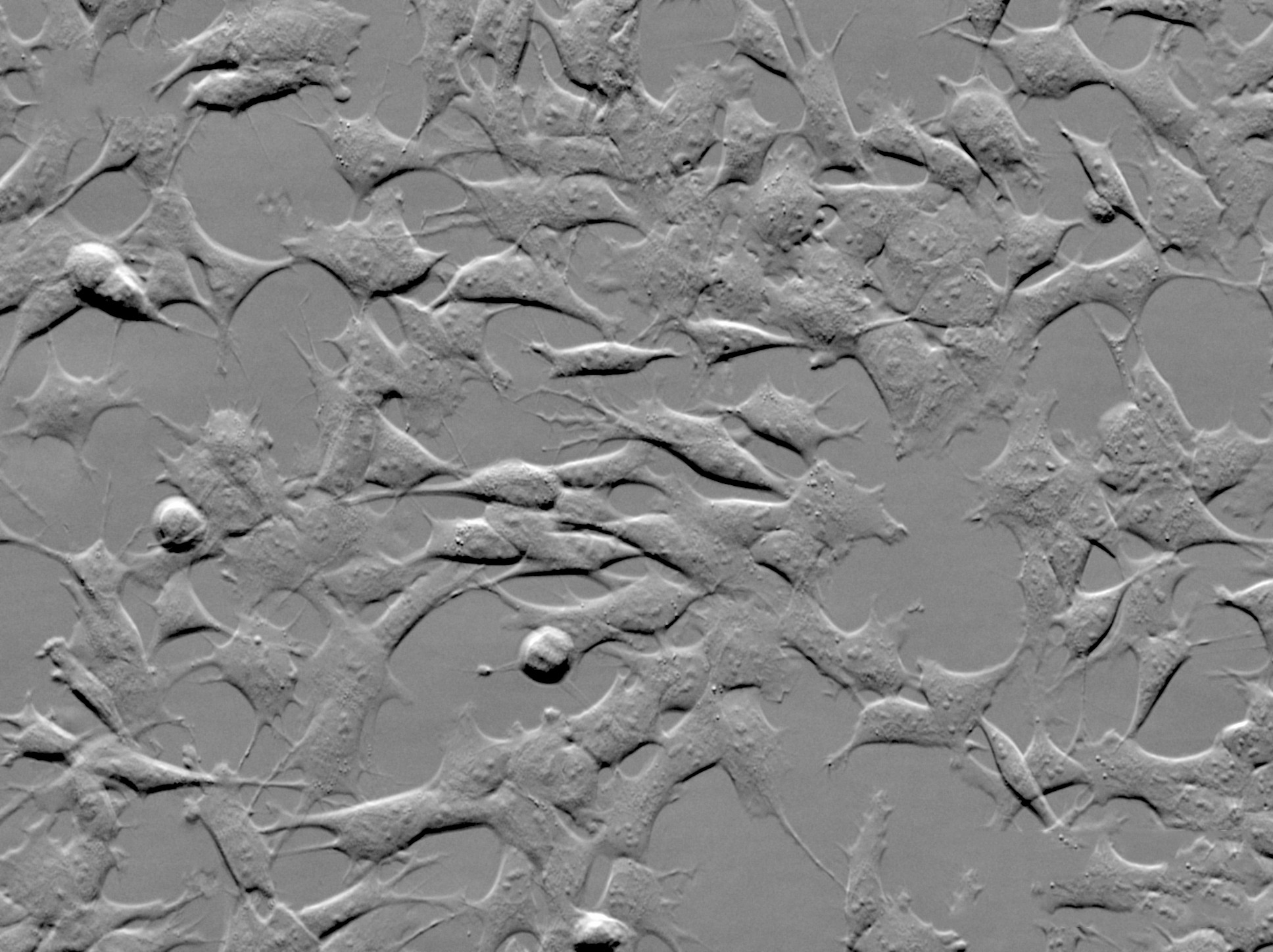
SH-SY5Y cells adhered to a surface

The history of suspension cell culture is closely tied to the overall history of cell and tissue culture. In 1885, Wilhelm Roux laid the groundwork for future tissue culture, by developing a saline buffer that was used to maintain living cells (chicken embryos) for a few days. Ross Granville Harrison in 1907 then developed in vitro cell culture techniques, including modifying the hanging drop technique for nerve cells and introducing aseptic technique to the culture process. Later in 1910, Montrose Thomas Burrows adapted Harrison's technique and collaborated with Alexis Carrel to establish multiple tissue cultures that could be maintained in vitro using fresh plasma combined with saline solutions. Carrel went on to develop the first known cell line, a line derived from chicken embryo heart which was maintained continuously for 34 years. Though the "immortality" of the cell line was later challenged by Leonard Hayflick, this was a major breakthrough and inspired others to pursue creating other cell lines. Notably in 1952, George Otto Gay and his assistant Mary Kubicek cultured the first human derived immortalized cell line - HeLa. While the other cell lines were adherent, HeLa cells were able to be maintained in suspension.

== Methods and maintenance ==
=== Isolating cells and starting a culture ===
All primary cells (cells derived directly from a subject) must first be removed from a subject, isolated (using digestion enzymes), and suspended in media before being cultured. However, this does not mean that these cells are compatible with suspension culture, as most mammalian cells are adherent and need to attach to a surface to divide. White blood cells can be taken from a subject and cultured in suspension, since they naturally exist in suspension in blood. Adhesion of white blood cells in vivo is typically the result of an inflammatory immune response and requires specific cell-cell interactions that should not occur in a suspension of a single type of white blood cell.

Immortalized mammalian cell lines (cells that are able to replicate indefinitely), plant cells, and insect cells can be obtained cryopreserved from manufacturers and used to start a suspension culture. To start a culture from cryopreserved cells, the cells must first be thawed and added to a flask or bioreactor containing media. Depending upon the cryoprotectant agent, the cells might need to be washed to avoid deleterious effects from the agent.

=== Suspension cell culture maintenance for laboratories ===
Suspension cell cultures are similar to adherent cultures in a number of ways. Both require specialized nutrient containing media, containers that allow for gas transfer, aseptic conditions to avoid contamination, and frequent passaging to prevent overcrowding of cells. However, even within these similarities there are a few key differences between these culture methods. For example, though both adherent and suspension cell cultures can be maintained in standard flasks such as the T-75 tissue culture flask, suspension cultures need to be agitated to avoid settling to the bottom of the flask. While adherent cell cultures can be maintained in flat flasks with a lot of surface area (to promote cell adhesion), suspension cultures require agitation otherwise the cells will fall to the bottom of a flask, greatly impacting their access to nutrients and oxygen, eventually resulting in cell death. For this reason, specialized flasks (including the spinner flask and shaker flask, discussed below) have been developed to agitate media and keep the cells in suspension. However, the agitation of media subjects the cells to shear forces which can stress the cells and negatively impact growth. Although both adherent and suspension cell cultures require media, media used in suspension culture may contain a surfactant to protect cells from shear forces in addition to the amino acids, vitamins and salt solution contained in culture media such as DMEM.

==== Spinner flasks ====
Spinner flasks, which are used for suspension cultures, contain a magnetic spinner bar which circulates the media throughout the flask and keeps cells in suspension. Spinner flasks contain one central capped opening flanked by two protruding arms which are also capped and allow for additional gas exchange. The magnetic spinner bar itself is typically suspended from a rod attached to the central cap so that it maximizes media circulation in the cell suspension. When culturing cells, the spinner flask containing cells is placed on a magnetic stir plate, inside of an incubator and the spinner parameters need to be adjusted carefully to avoid killing cells with shear forces.

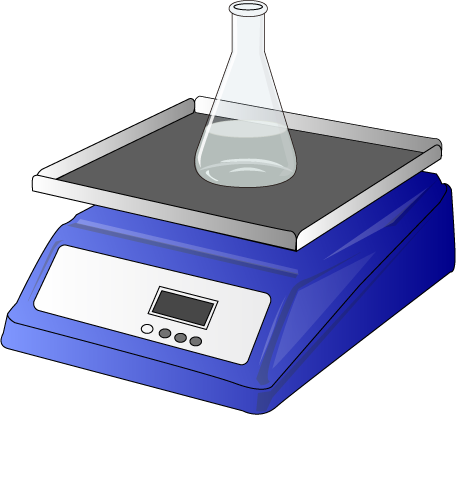
Orbital laboratory shaker.

==== Shaker flasks ====
Shaker flasks are also used for suspension cultures, and appear similar to typical Erlenmeyer flasks but have a semi-permeable lid to allow for gas exchange. During suspension cell culturing, shaker flasks are loaded with cells and the appropriate media before they are placed on an orbital shaker. To optimize cell culture proliferation, the revolutions per minute of the orbital shaker must be adjusted within an acceptable range depending on the cells and media used. The media must be allowed to stir, but cannot disturb the cells too much causing them excessive stress. Shaker flasks are often used for fermentation cultures with microorganisms such as yeast.

==== Passaging (subculturing) cells ====
Passaging, or subculturing, suspension cell cultures is more straightforward than passaging adherent cells. While adherent cells require initial processing with a digestion enzyme, to remove them from the culture flask surface, suspension cells are floating freely in media. A sample from the culture can then be taken and analyzed to determine the ratio of living to dead cells (using a stain such as trypan blue) and the total concentration of cells in the flask (using a hemocytometer). Using this information, a portion of the current suspension culture will be transferred to fresh flask and supplemented with media. The passage number should be recorded, particularly if the cells are primary and not immortalized as primary cell lines will eventually undergo senescence. Suspension cells are often passaged outright without changing the media. In order to change the media for a suspension culture, all cells from the current container should be removed and centrifuged into a pellet. The excess media is then removed from the centrifuged sample, and the flask is refilled with fresh media before re-adding the cells to the flask. Media changes and subculturing are important to maintain cell lines, since cells will consume nutrients in media to expand. Cells will also grow exponentially until the environment becomes inhospitable due to lack of nutrients, extreme pH, or lack of space to grow.

== Commercial applications of suspension cell culture ==
Unlike adherent cultures, which are limited by the surface area provided for them to expand on, suspension cultures are limited by the volume of their container. Meaning, suspension cells can exist in much larger quantities in a given flask and are preferred when using cells to make products including proteins, antibodies, metabolites or just to produce a high volume of cells. However, there are far fewer mammalian suspension cell lines than mammalian adhesive cell lines. Most large scale suspension culture involves non-mammalian cells and takes place in bioreactors.

Some examples of suspension cell culture:

- Antibody production by hybridomas
- Fermentation cultures for beer
- Therapeutic protein production by CHO cells
- Secondary metabolite production for drugs in plant cells
- Recombinant protein production in insect cells
- Bulk protein production for enzyme and vaccine research
- Producing cell suspension cultures to support oncolytic adenovirus used in cancer immunotherapy

== List of suspension cell lines ==
| Cell line | Meaning | Organism | Origin tissue | Morphology | Links |
|---|---|---|---|---|---|
| CHO | Chinese Hamster Ovary | Hamster | Ovary | Epithelial | ECACC Cellosaurus |
| HeLa | "Henrietta Lacks" | Human | Cervix epithelium | Cervical carcinoma | ECACC Cellosaurus |
| H-9 | | Human | Embryonic stem cells | Lymphoblast | Cellosaurus |
| Jurkat | | Human | White blood cells | Lymphoblast | ECACC Cellosaurus |
| C6/36 | | Insect - Asian tiger mosquito | Larval tissue | | ECACC Cellosaurus |
| High Five | | Insect (moth) - Trichoplusia ni | Ovary | | Cellosaurus |
| S2 | Schneider 2 | Insect - Drosophila melanogaster | Late stage (20–24 hours old) embryos | | ATCC Cellosaurus |
| Sf21 | Spodoptera frugiperda 21 | Insect (moth) - Spodoptera frugiperda | Ovary | | ECACC Cellosaurus |
| Sf9 | Spodoptera frugiperda 9 | Insect (moth) - Spodoptera frugiperda | Ovary | Epithelial | ECACC Cellosaurus |
| SH-SY5Y | | Human | Bone marrow | Epithelial | Cellosaurus |
| PC-3 | | Human | Prostate | Epithelial | Cellosaurus |

== See also ==
- Cell culture
- Adherent culture
- Bio-MEMS
- Cell adhesion
  - Cell adhesion molecule
