= John Tarbell =

American engineer

- Scientific career
- Fields: Biomedical engineering
- Institutions: City College of New York

Not to be confused American military officer and Mississippi Supreme Court judge Jonathan Tarbell

John M. Tarbell is an American biomedical engineer, currently a CUNY and Wallace Coulter Distinguished Professor at City College of New York.

He graduated from Rutgers University, and University of Delaware.
