= Primary cell culture =

Culture of cells from fresh tissues

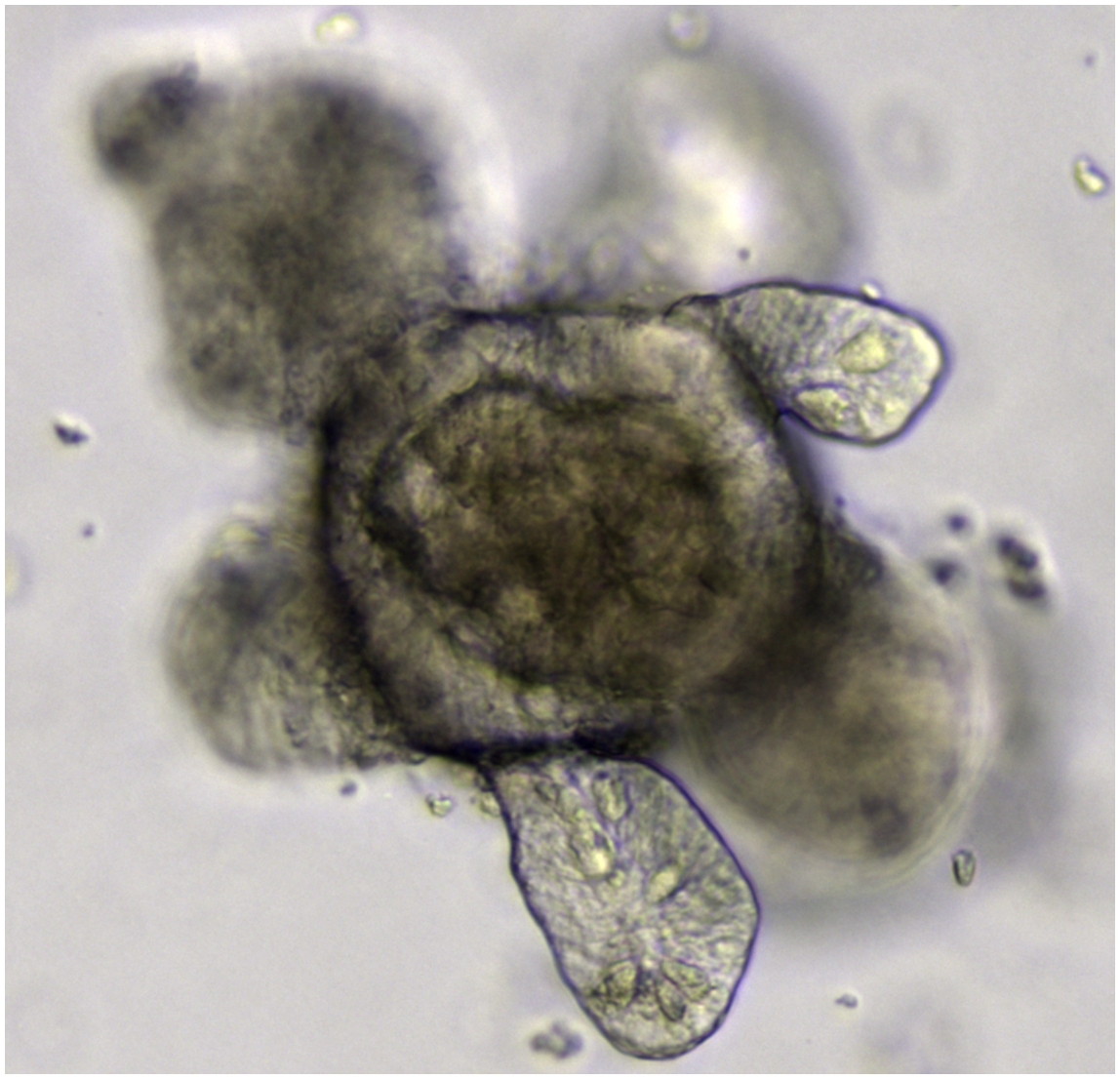
- Primary interstinal organoid culture

Identifiers
- MeSH: D061251

Primary cell culture is the ex vivo culture of cells freshly obtained from a multicellular organism, as opposed to the culture of immortalized cell lines. In general, primary cell cultures are considered more representative of in vivo tissues than cell lines, and this is recognized legally in some countries such as the UK (Human Tissue Act 2004). However, primary cells require adequate substrate and nutrient conditions to thrive and after a certain number of divisions they acquire a senescent phenotype, leading to irreversible cell cycle arrest. The generation of cell lines stems from these two reasons. Primary cells can become immortalized either spontaneously (e.g. HeLa cells) or by genetic modification (e.g. HEK cells), at which point they become cell lines which can be subcultured indefinitely.

Because of their requirements for viability, primary cell cultures did not become widespread until the 2000s. These cultures present several advantages over cell lines, including a better representation of the cellular heterogeneity of tissues, a more faithful transcriptomic and proteomic profile (especially when cultured in 3D) and more realistic functional responses, including drug responses. In contrast, immortalized cell lines are known to become homogeneous through the natural selection of specific subpopulations, to undergo genetic drift and to acquire genetic aberrations. In many cases, cell lines have been misidentified, contaminated with other cells or infected with Mycoplasma, small intracellular bacteria that went undetected for decades.

When whole or partial tissues are isolated and maintained ex vivo, the procedure is termed primary tissue culture. More specific terms include organotypic culture, tissue slices and explants.

Neuronal primary cell cultures are cells collected from the brain of an organism. For example, they can be used when examining substances effect on cell viability, which can further on be potential treatments for brain deficits.

== Monolayer cultures ==
Monolayer cultures refer to cell cultures where cells are grown in a single, flat layer on the surface of a culture dish or substrate. In a monolayer culture, cells adhere to the substrate and spread out in a two-dimensional arrangement. This type of cell culture is commonly used in laboratory settings for various purposes, including research, drug testing, and biotechnology.

Key features of monolayer cultures include:

- Two-Dimensional Growth: Cells in monolayer cultures grow in a single plane, adhering to the surface of the culture vessel. This flat arrangement allows for easy observation and manipulation of individual cells.
- Adherence to Substrate: The cells attach to the surface of the culture dish or flask, and their growth and behavior can be influenced by the characteristics of the substrate.on the other words In cell culture, adherence to substrate describes a cell's capacity to adhere to a surface and proliferate. Many elements, including surface energy, substrate topography, and roughness, mediate the process of cell attachment. The study of artificial polymer surfaces with varying chemical, topological, and mechanical cues that regulate cell activities has focused attention on the interaction between external surfaces and cells. In a study that was published in the journal RSC Advances in 2021, the impact of roughness and surface energy on cell adhesion and growth was examined. The most advantageous circumstances for effective cell adhesion, development, and proliferation were discovered by the study to be moderate surface energy and intermediate roughness ratio.
- Cell Proliferation: Cells in monolayer cultures can undergo cell division and proliferation. This feature is crucial for experimental studies and the production of a larger number of cells for subsequent analyses.
- Observation and Imaging: The two-dimensional nature of monolayer cultures makes it convenient for microscopic observation and imaging. Researchers can easily visualize the cells, study their morphology, and monitor changes over time.
- Cell Differentiation: Depending on the cell type and culture conditions, monolayer cultures can be used to induce cell differentiation. This is particularly important in studying developmental processes and tissue-specific functions.

=== Monolayer cultures for personalized therapy ===
The endocrine cancer with the highest incidence is thyroid cancer (TC). Differentiated thyroid cells (DTC) that originate from follicular thyroid cells account for over 90% of total thyroid cells (TC). Papillary TC (PTC), follicular TC (FTC), and Hürthle cell TC are examples of DTC. One percent of TC is anaplastic TC (ATC), which accounts for 15–40% of TC deaths.

Mortality is one of the biggest obstacles to current treatment techniques against aggressive DTC or ATC. These strategies are not entirely effective against these conditions. Recent years have seen advancements in our knowledge of the molecular and genetic underpinnings of TC development as well as the introduction of novel medications, such as tyrosine kinase inhibitors (TKIs), which target the oncogenic or signaling kinases linked to cellular proliferation.

Preclinical models have made use of thyroid cell lines that were isolated from tumor cells and selected for their high rate of proliferation in vitro. As a result of their adaptation to in vitro growth circumstances, these cells actually lose the distinctive characteristics of the original tumor. Because of these factors, there are significant restrictions on the usage of these cell lines. More recently, monolayer cultures of human primary cells have been created, and their biological behavior has been studied. Furthermore, whereas human primary cell cultures may now be created from samples of fine-needle aspiration cytology from aggressive dedifferentiated DTC or ATC, primary TC cells were previously only obtained by surgical biopsies. Without the use of useless medications, testing several TKIs in vitro on individual patients can aid in the development of novel, individualized treatments.

Limitations of monolayer culture and motivations:

Scientists are investigating novel models that can more accurately mimic the structure and function of human organs because to the limitations of monolayer culture settings. Protocol improvements in recent times have led to the creation of three-dimensional (3D) organ-like architectures known as "organoids," which are able to exhibit properties of their corresponding real organs, such as morphological features, functional activities, and individual responses to particular pathogens.

== Cell culture protocol ==
For in vitro investigations to be conducted correctly, the cell culture protocol for a particular cell line must be optimized. The best culture conditions for different cell lines can differ significantly due to the heterogeneity of germ cell malignancies.

== See also ==
- 3D cell culture
- Induced pluripotent stem cell
- Patient-derived xenograft
- Stem cell laws
