= Contact inhibition =

Two related phenomena in cell biology

In cell biology, contact inhibition refers to two different but closely related phenomena: contact inhibition of locomotion (CIL) and contact inhibition of proliferation (CIP). CIL refers to the avoidance behavior exhibited by fibroblast-like cells when in contact with one another. In most cases, when two cells contact each other, they attempt to alter their locomotion in a different direction to avoid future collision. When a collision is unavoidable, a different phenomenon occurs whereby the growth of the cells of the culture itself eventually stops in a cell-density-dependent manner.

Both types of contact inhibition are well-known properties of normal cells and contribute to the regulation of proper tissue growth, differentiation, and development. Both types of regulation are normally negated and overcome during organogenesis, during embryonic development, and during tissue and wound healing. However, contact inhibition of locomotion and proliferation are both aberrant or absent in cancer cells, and the absence of this regulation contributes to tumorigenesis.

== Mechanism ==
Contact inhibition is a regulatory mechanism that functions to keep cells growing into a layer one cell thick (a monolayer). If a cell has plenty of available substrate space, it replicates rapidly and moves freely. This process continues until the cells occupy the entire substratum. At this point, normal cells will stop replicating.

As motile cells come into contact in confluent cultures, they exhibit decreased mobility and mitotic activity over time. Exponential growth has been shown to occur between colonies in contact for numerous days, with the inhibition of mitotic activity occurring far later. This delay between cell-cell contact and the onset of proliferation inhibition is shortened as the culture becomes more confluent. Thus, it may be reasonably concluded that cell-cell contact is an essential condition for contact inhibition of proliferation, but is by itself insufficient for mitotic inhibition. In addition to making contact with other cells, the contact-inhibited cells must also be forced to reduce their cell area under the mechanical stress and constraints imposed by surrounding cells. Indeed, it has been suggested that mechanical tension acts as an inhibitory signal for mitosis. Such an inhibition of mitotic activity is a local phenomenon; it occurs between a select few cells in a likely heterogeneous culture.

=== Role in cancer ===
Untransformed human cells exhibit normal cellular behavior and mediate their growth and proliferation via interplay between environmental nutrients, growth factor signaling, and cell density. As cell density increases and the culture becomes confluent, they initiate cell cycle arrest and downregulate proliferation and mitogen signaling pathways regardless of external factors or cellular metabolism. This property is known as contact inhibition of proliferation and is essential to proper embryonic development, as well as tissue repair, differentiation, and morphogenesis. Cancerous cells typically lose this property and thus divide and grow over each other in an uncontrolled manner, even when in contact with neighbouring cells. This results in the invasion of surrounding tissues, their metastasis to nearby organs, and eventually tumorigenesis. Cells of naked mole rats, a species in which cancer has never been observed, show hypersensitivity to contact inhibition. This finding may provide a clue to cancer resistance. Furthermore, recent studies have further revealed some mechanisms of contact inhibition of proliferation and its potential implications in cancer therapy.

Furthermore, it has been shown that cell-cell adhesion formation not only restricts growth and proliferation by imposing physical constraints such as cell area but also by triggering signaling pathways that downregulate proliferation. One such pathway is the Hippo-YAP signaling pathway, which is largely responsible for inhibiting cell growth in mammals. This pathway consists primarily of a phosphorylation cascade involving serine kinases and is mediated by regulatory proteins, which regulate cell growth by binding to growth-controlling genes. The serine/threonine kinase Hippo (Mst1/Mst2, encoded by the STK4 and STK3 genes, respectively, in mammals) activates a secondary kinase (Lats1/Lats2), which phosphorylates YAP, a transcriptional activator of growth genes. The phosphorylation of YAP serves to export it from the nucleus and prevent it from activating growth-promoting genes; this is how the Hippo-YAP pathway inhibits cell growth. More importantly, the Hippo-YAP pathway uses upstream elements to act in response to cell-cell contact and controls density-dependent inhibition of proliferation. For example, cadherins are transmembrane proteins that form cellular junctions via homophilic binding and thus act as detectors for cell-cell contact. Cadherin-mediated activation of the inhibitory pathway involves the transmembrane E-cadherin forming a homophilic bond to activate α- and β-catenin, which then stimulate downstream components of the Hippo-YAP pathway to ultimately downregulate cell growth. This is consistent with the finding that E-cadherin overexpression hinders metastasis and tumorigenesis. Because YAP is shown to be associated with mitogenic growth factor signaling and thus cell proliferation, future studies will likely focus on the Hippo-YAP pathway's role in cancer cells.

However, contact-inhibited cells undergo cell cycle arrest, but do not senesce. It has been shown that contact-inhibited cells resume normal proliferation and mitogen signaling upon being replated in a less confluent culture. Thus, contact inhibition of proliferation may be viewed as a reversible form of cell cycle arrest. Furthermore, to transition from cell cycle arrest to senescence, contact-inhibited cells must activate growth-activating pathways such as mTOR. Once cells in high-density cultures become confluent enough such that the cell area falls below a critical value, the adhesion formations trigger pathways that downregulate mitogen signaling and cell proliferation. The growth-promoting mTOR pathway is therefore inhibited, and consequently, the contact-inhibited cells cannot transition from cell cycle arrest to senescence. This has crucial implications in cancer therapy; even though cancer cells are not contact-inhibited, confluent cancer cell cultures still suppress their senescence machinery. Therefore, this may be a plausible explanation for why senescence-inducing cancer therapy drugs are ineffective.

=== Cell motility ===
In most cases, when two cells collide, they attempt to move in a different direction to avoid future collisions; this behavior is known as contact inhibition of locomotion. As the two cells come into contact, their locomotive process is paralyzed. This is accomplished via a multistep, multifaceted mechanism that involves the formation of a cell-cell adhesion complex upon collision. The disassembly of this complex is thought to be driven largely by tension in the cells and ultimately results in the colliding cells' changing directions.

First, motile cells collide and touch via their respective lamellae, whose actin exhibits high retrograde flow. A cellular adhesion forms between the lamellae, reducing the actins' retrograde flow rate in the area immediately surrounding the adhesion. Consequently, the cells' velocity and motility are reduced. This then allows actin stress fibers and microtubules to form and align with each other in both colliding partners. The alignment of these stress fibers locally accumulates elastic tension in the lamellae. Eventually, the tension buildup becomes too great, and the cell adhesion complex dissociates, collapses the lamellae protrusions, and releases the cells in different directions in an effort to alleviate the elastic tension. A possible alternate event that also leads to the assembly dissociation is that upon stress fiber alignment, the cells' leading edges repolarize away from the contiguous lamellae. This produces significant elastic tension across the entire cell bodies, not only at the local site of contact, and likewise causes the adhesion complex's disassembly. Elastic tension has been thought to be the primary driving force of the protrusion collapse, complex disassembly, and the cells' dispersion. Though this hypothetical tension has been characterized and visualized, how tension builds in lamellae and how cell repolarization contributes to tension buildup remain open to investigation.

Furthermore, as replication increases the number of cells, the number of directions those cells can move without touching another is decreased. Cells will also attempt to move away from another cell because they stick better to the area around them, a structure called the substratum, than to other cells. When the two cells that collide are different types of cells, one or both may respond to the collision.

Some immortalised cell lines, despite being able to proliferate indefinitely, still experience contact inhibition, though generally to a lesser extent than normal cell lines.

== See also ==
- Hyaluronic acid synthase
