= Elizabeth Wayne =

Biomedical engineer

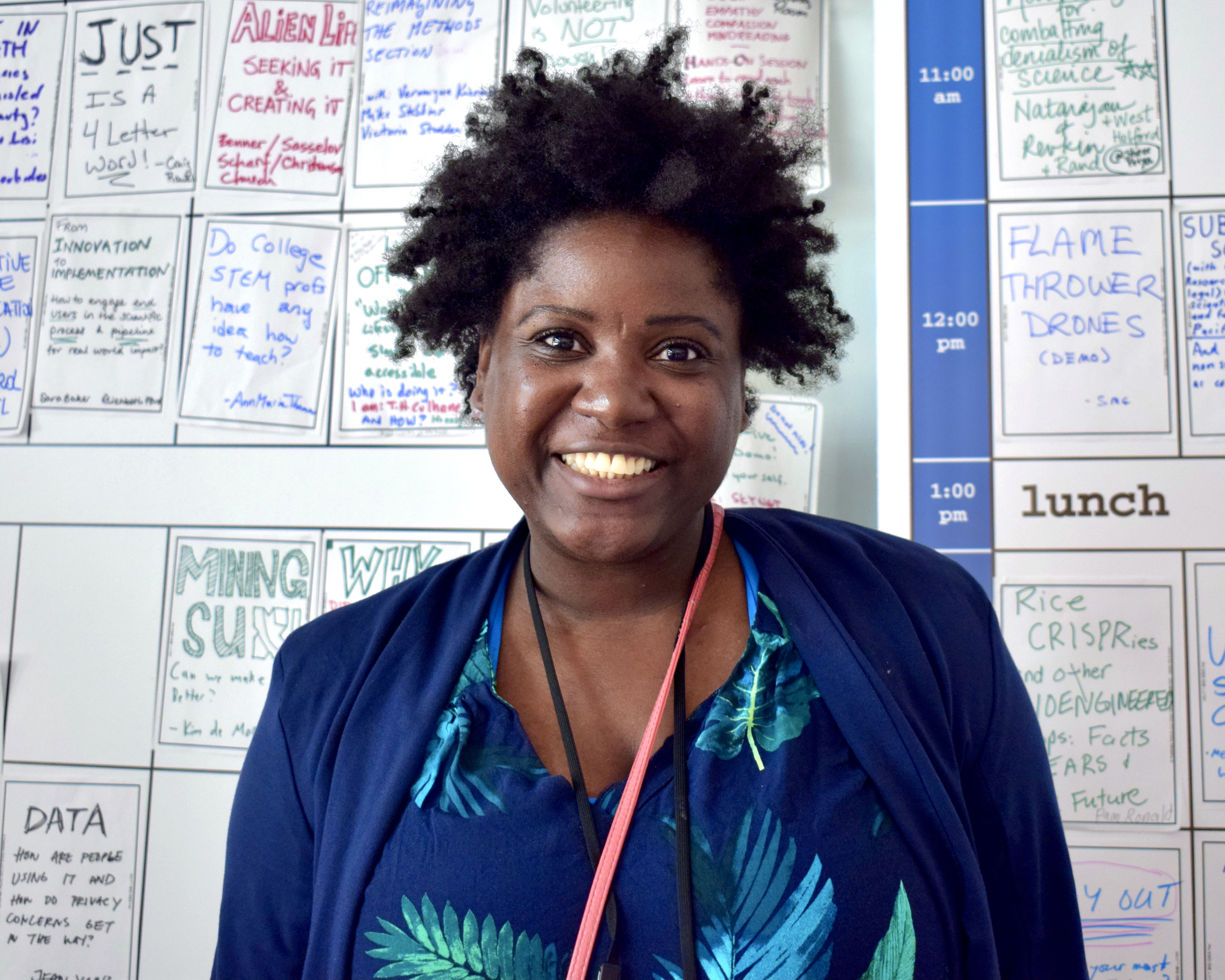
- Wayne at Science Foo Camp in 2018
- Education: University of Pennsylvania Mississippi School for Mathematics and Science
- Scientific career
- Workplaces: University of North Carolina at Chapel Hill Cornell University
- Website: www.lizwaynephd.com

Elizabeth Wayne is an Assistant Professor of Biomedical Engineering at University of Washington. Previously she was an Assistant Professor of Biomedical and Chemical Engineering at Carnegie Mellon University and, prior to that, a Postdoc at the Center for Nanotechnology in Drug Delivery at the University of North Carolina at Chapel Hill. Wayne was a 2017 TED fellow and is a member of a number of professional societies, including the National Society of Black Physicists.

== Early life and education ==
Born and raised in Mississippi, Wayne attended the Mississippi School for Mathematics and Science in Columbus, MS before moving away to attend school at the University of Pennsylvania. Wayne earned an undergraduate degree in physics at the University of Pennsylvania in 2009. She later earned her PhD from Cornell University, researching immune cell-mediated drug delivery. Wayne organised the 2013 Northeast Conference for Undergraduate Women in Physics, raising $60,000 for delegates to attend.

== Research ==
Wayne joined the Department of Bioengineering at the University of Washington in January 2024. Previously, Wayne was a part of the faculty of Carnegie Mellon University, an assistant professor of Biomedical Engineering and Chemical Engineering. Her postdoc was with the Center for Nanotechnology in Drug Delivery at the University of North Carolina at Chapel Hill. Her research focuses on cancer treatment using cells to deliver proteins, genes and drugs.

Her research focuses on drug delivery for cancer treatment, specifically the use of macrophages to deliver therapeutic genes to solid tumors. Her research laboratory at Carnegie Mellon works to understand how macrophage activation can be used to interpret drug pharmacokinetics and pharmacodynamics during disease progression and tissue regeneration.

At the University of Washington, she leads the Wayne Research Group, working on engineering tools to modulate monocyte cell fate within chronic diseases. This research utilized the monocytes to reduce inflammation by infiltrating peripheral tissue. They can be useful in treating comorbidities, the presence of one or more additional medical condition in a person who already has a primary diagnosis. Their focus is on delivery, diagnostics, and discovery.

== Awards ==
Wayne has won many awards and fellowships. At Cornell, she won the Robert Mozia Graduate Distinguished Service Award, the CMM Young Investigator Award,theAlice & Constance Cook Award, and the Cornell Women’s Day Leadership Award. She was also awarded: the Howard Hughes Medical Institute Med-into-Grad Fellowship, funds from the NCI Physical Sciences in Oncology Network and the Sage and Provost Diversity Fellowship.

== Public engagement ==
She co-hosts the podcast PhDivas, which discusses academia, culture, and social justice across the STEM/ humanities divide. She has been a chief organizer in the Conference for Undergraduate Women in Physics (CUWIP) at Cornell as well as a panelist and workshop leader at CUWIPs held at Yale and Harvard. In 2017 she was awarded a TED fellowship, which identifies her as "a visionary who collaborates across disciplines in an effort to create positive change around the world". She delivered a TED talk in April 2017 titled 'We can hack our immune cells to fight cancer', which has had over one million views.

== Publications ==
- Wayne, EC, Chandrasekaran, S, Mitchell, MJ, Chan MF, Lee, RE, Schaffer, CB, & King, MR (2016). TRAIL-coated leukocytes that prevent the bloodborne metastasis of prostate cancer. Journal of Controlled Release. Journal of Controlled Release : Official Journal of the Controlled Release Society, 223, 215–223.
- Mitchell MJ, Wayne EC, Rana K, Schaffer CB, King MR. (2014) TRAIL-Coated Leukocytes that Kill Cancer Cells in the Circulation. PNAS 111(3) 930–935
- Rosenthal JA, Huang C-J, Doody AM, Leung T, Mineta K, Feng D, Wayne EC, Nozomi Nishimura, Cynthia Leifer, Matthew P. DeLisa, Susana Mendez, David Putnam. (2014) Mechanistic Insight into the TH1-Biased Immune Response to Recombinant Subunit Vaccines Delivered by Probiotic Bacteria-Derived Outer Membrane Vesicles. PLoS ONE 9(11): e112802.
