= Aqueous two-phase system =

Aqueous biphasic systems (ABS) or aqueous two-phase systems (ATPS) are clean alternatives for traditional organic-water solvent extraction systems.

ABS are formed when either two polymers, one polymer and one kosmotropic salt, or two salts (one chaotropic salt and the other a kosmotropic salt) are mixed at appropriate concentrations or at a particular temperature. The two phases are mostly composed of water and non volatile components, thus eliminating volatile organic compounds. They have been used for many years in biotechnological applications as non-denaturing and benign separation media. Recently, it has been found that ATPS can be used for separations of metal ions like mercury and cobalt, carbon nanotubes, environmental remediation, metallurgical applications and as a reaction media.

== Introduction ==
In 1896, Beijerinck first noted an 'incompatibility' in solutions of agar, a water-soluble polymer, with soluble starch or gelatine. Upon mixing, they separated into two immiscible phases.

Subsequent investigation led to the determination of many other aqueous biphasic systems, of which the polyethylene glycol (PEG) - dextran system is the most extensively studied. Other systems that form aqueous biphases are: PEG - sodium carbonate or PEG and phosphates, citrates or sulfates. In addition to inorganic salts, small biological organic phosphates such as adenosine triphosphate (ATP) have also been found to undergo robust, protein-independent liquid–liquid phase separation (LLPS) and form an ATPS when combined with PEG under macromolecular crowding conditions.Aqueous biphasic systems are used during downstream processing mainly in biotechnological and chemical industries.

== The two phases ==
It is a common observation that when oil and water are poured into the same container, they separate into two phases or layers, because they are immiscible. In general, aqueous (or water-based) solutions, being polar, are immiscible with non-polar organic solvents (cooking oil, chloroform, toluene, hexane etc.) and form a two-phase system. However, in an ABS, both immiscible components are water-based.

The formation of the distinct phases is affected by the pH, temperature and ionic strength of the two components, and separation occurs when the amount of a polymer present exceeds a certain limiting concentration (which is determined by the above factors).

=== PEG–dextran system ===
The "upper phase" is formed by the more hydrophobic polyethylene glycol (PEG), which is of lower density than the "lower phase," consisting of the more hydrophilic and denser dextran solution.

Although PEG is inherently denser than water, it occupies the upper layer. This is believed to be due to its solvent 'ordering' properties, which excludes excess water, creating a low density water environment. The degree of polymerization of PEG also affects the phase separation and the partitioning of molecules during extraction.

== Advantages ==
ABS is an excellent method to employ for the extraction of proteins/enzymes and other labile biomolecules from crude cell extracts or other mixtures. Most often, this technique is employed in enzyme technology during industrial or laboratory production of enzymes.

- They provide mild conditions that do not harm or denature unstable/labile biomolecules
- The interfacial stress (at the interface between the two layers) is far lower (400-fold less) than water-organic solvent systems used for solvent extraction, causing less damage to the molecule to be extracted
- The polymer layer stabilizes the extracted protein molecules, favouring a higher concentration of the desired protein in one of the layers, resulting in an effective extraction
- Specialised systems may be developed (by varying factors such as temperature, degree of polymerisation, presence of certain ions etc. ) to favour the enrichment of a specific compound, or class of compounds, into one of the two phases. They are sometimes used simultaneously with ion-exchange resins for better extraction
- Separation of the phases and the partitioning of the compounds occurs rapidly. This allows the extraction of the desired molecule before endogenous proteases can degrade them.
- These systems are amenable to scale-ups, from laboratory-sized set-ups to those that can handle the requirements of industrial production. They may be employed in continuous protein-extraction processes.

Specificity may be further increased by tagging ligands specific to the desired enzyme, onto the polymer. This results in a preferential binding of the enzyme to the polymer, increasing the effectiveness of the extraction.

One major disadvantage, however, is the cost of materials involved, namely high-purity dextrans employed for the purpose. However, other low-cost alternatives such as less refined dextrans, hydroxypropyl starch derivatives and high-salt solutions are also available.

== Thermodynamic Modeling ==
Besides the experimental study, it is important to have a good thermodynamic model to describe and predict liquid-liquid equilibrium conditions in engineering and design. To obtain global and reliable parameters for thermodynamic models usually, phase equilibrium data is suitable for this purpose. As there are polymer, electrolyte and water in polymer/salt systems, all different types of interactions should be taken into account. Up to now, several models have been used such as NRTL, Chen-NRTL, Wilson, UNIQUAC, NRTL-NRF and UNIFAC-NRF. It has been shown that, in all cases, the mentioned models were successful in reproducing tie-line data of polymer/salt aqueous two-phase systems. In most of the previous works, excess Gibbs functions have been used for modeling.

== Bibliography ==
- Albertsson, P-A (1986). Partitioning of Cell Particles and Macromolecules. John Wiley & Sons.
- Zaslavsky, Boris (1995). Aqueous Two-Phase Partitioning: Physical Chemistry and Bioanalytical Applications. Marcel Dekker Inc. ISBN 978-0-8247-9461-3.
- Bakhshi, Hamid; Mobalegholeslam, Poorya (2017). "Phase equilibria calculations of electrolyte solutions containing water- polymer- salt using a new thermodynamic model, applicable in aqueous two phase systems". Fluid Phase Equilibria. 434: 222–32. doi:10.1016/j.fluid.2016.11.033.
- Hamta, afshin; Dehghani, Mohammad Reza; Gholami, Mahsa (2017). "experimental data on aqueous two–phase system containing PEG–6000 and Na2CO3 at T = (293.15, 303.15 and 313.15) K"". Journal of Molecular Liquids. 241: 144–149. doi:10.1016/j.molliq.2017.05.149.
