= Acetalated dextran =

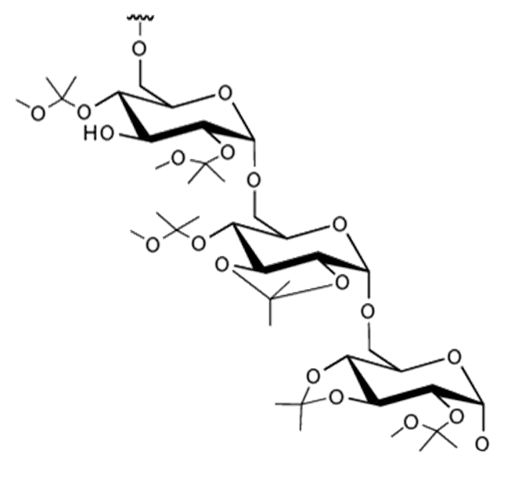

Names
- IUPAC name varies
- Other names Ac-DEX, Ace-DEX, modified dextran

Identifiers
ChemSpider	none

Properties
Molar mass	varies
Appearance	white powder
- Except where otherwise noted, data are given for materials in their standard state (at 25 °C [77 °F], 100 kPa). Infobox references

Acetalated dextran is a biodegradable polymer based on dextran that has acetal modified hydroxyl groups. After synthesis, the hydrophilic polysaccharide dextran is rendered insoluble in water, but soluble in organic solvents. This allows it to be processed in the same manner as many polyesters, like poly(lactic-co-glycolic acid), through processes like solvent evaporation and emulsion. Acetalated dextran is structurally different from acetylated dextran.

== History ==
Acetalated dextran was first reported in 2008 out of the lab of Jean Fréchet at the University of California, Berkeley in the College of Chemistry by inventors Eric Bachelder, Tristan Beaudette and Kyle Broaders. This version of acetalated dextran, often abbreviated Ac-DEX, has dextran and exceedingly low levels of acetone and methanol as degradation products. In 2012, in the laboratory of Kristy Ainslie, at Ohio State University in the College of Pharmacy, polymer synthesis was modified to release ethanol in place of methanol upon degradation. The ethanol producing version of acetalated dextran is often abbreviated Ace-DEX.

== Properties ==
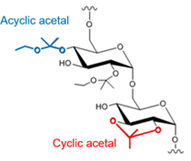
Cyclic and acyclic acetals on acetalated dextran which degrades to dextran, acetone, and ethanol.

During the synthesis of acetalated dextran both acyclic and cyclic acetals are formed. The acyclic acetals degrade into an acetone and an alcohol, whereas cyclic acetals degrade into acetone. The ratio of cyclic to acyclic acetals varies with reaction time since acyclic acetals are kinetically favored and cyclic acetals are the thermodynamically favored. This unique formation of cyclic and acyclic acetals leads to varying degradation time because the two acetal groups hydrolyze at different rates. Acetalated dextran's degradation time can vary from hours to a month or more at pH 7.2. Also, acetalated dextran is unique because it is acid sensitive. Therefore, at lower pH acetalated dextran degrades more rapidly, which results in a polymer that degrades approximately two logs faster at pH 5 compared to pH 7. The acid-sensitivity of Ac-DEX has illustrated, when formulated into nanoparticles encapsulating a protein antigen, more efficient presentation of antigen to both MHC class I and MHC class II, over other non-acid sensitive polymers like PLGA and non degradable materials like gold nanoparticles.

== Applications ==
Because of the ability of acetalated dextran to degrade more rapidly in low pH environments like the phagolysosome of a macrophage or dendritic cell, it has been used as polymeric micro/nanoparticles. Acetalated dextran was originally developed as a vaccine carrier, but has been used for drug delivery, tissue engineering and infectious disease vaccine delivery. Its unique degradation rates have led to finely tuned release of therapeutic proteins and vaccine elements.

Ac-DEX has also been shown the allow proteins to be stored outside the cold chain.

Formation of nanoparticles with Ac-DEX can be made through standard methods like emulsion, spray drying and electrospray. Using sonication based emulsion, inorganic nanoparticles have been embedded into Ac-DEX particles to for a composite material for cancer therapy. Also they have been used as a core material for cell membrane coating. Spray drying Ace-DEX has been shown to generate particles that preferentially bind to B cells.
