= Dextran =

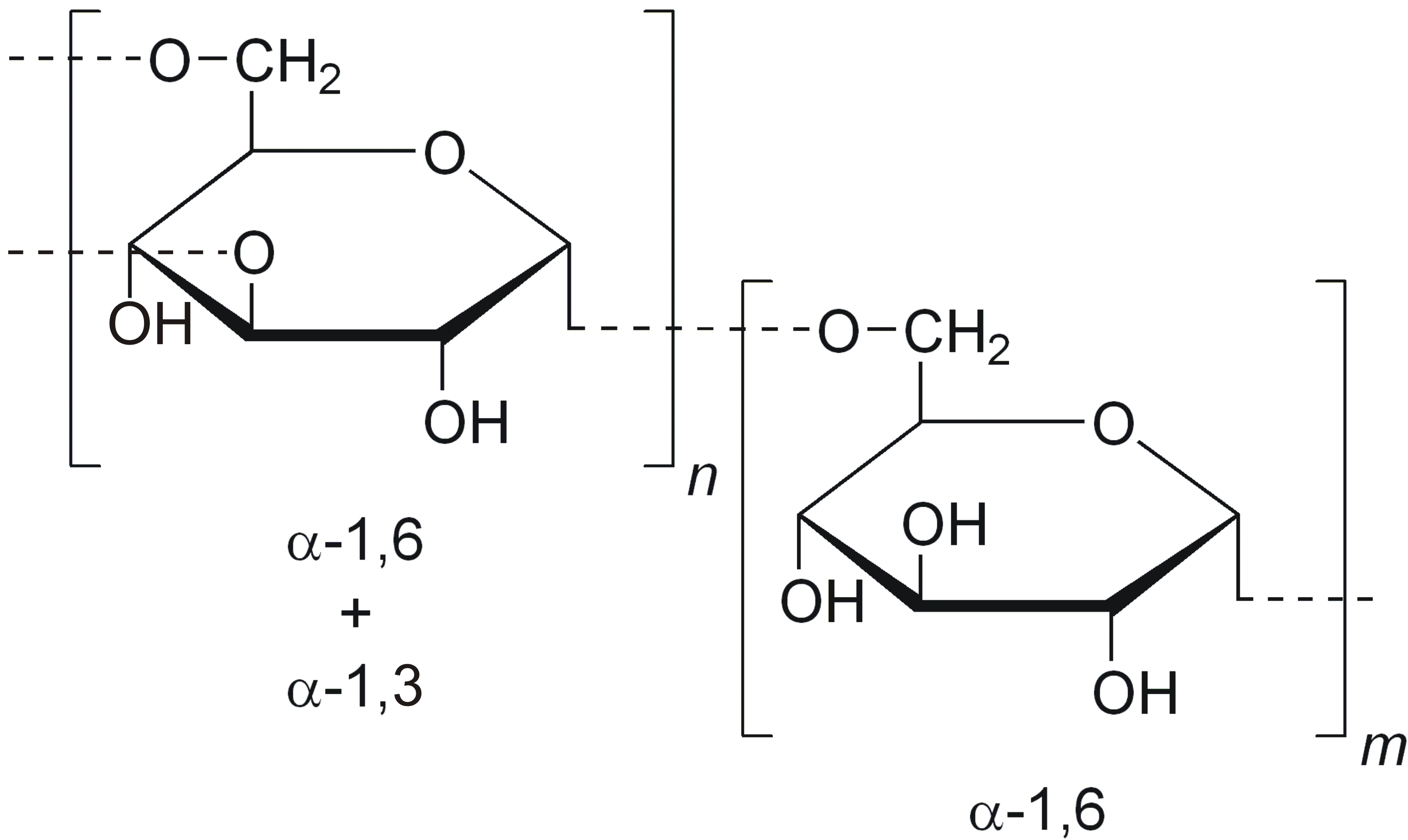

Identifiers
CAS Number	9004-54-0
ChemSpider	none
ECHA InfoCard	100.029.694
KEGG	C00372
UNII	05Q25F6XJ3
CompTox Dashboard (EPA)	DTXSID8020385

Properties
Chemical formula	H(C_{6}H_{10}O_{5})_{x}OH
Molar mass	Variable

Pharmacology
ATC code	B05AA05 (WHO)
- Except where otherwise noted, data are given for materials in their standard state (at 25 °C [77 °F], 100 kPa). verify (what is ?) Infobox references

Dextran is a complex branched glucan (polysaccharide derived from the condensation of glucose), originally derived from wine. IUPAC defines dextrans as "Branched poly-α-d-glucosides of microbial origin having glycosidic bonds predominantly C-1 → C-6". Dextran chains are of varying lengths (from 3 to 2000 kilodaltons).

The polymer main chain consists of α-1,6 glycosidic linkages between glucose monomers, with branches from α-1,3 linkages. This characteristic branching distinguishes a dextran from a dextrin, which is a straight chain glucose polymer tethered by α-1,4 or α-1,6 linkages.

== Occurrence ==
Dextran was discovered by Louis Pasteur as a microbial product in wine, but mass production was only possible after the development by Allene Jeanes of a process using bacteria. Dental plaque is rich in dextrans. Dextran is a complicating contaminant in the refining of sugar because it elevates the viscosity of sucrose solutions and fouls plumbing.

Dextran is now produced from sucrose by certain lactic acid bacteria of the order Lactobacillales. Species include Leuconostoc mesenteroides and Streptococcus mutans. The structure of dextran produced depends not only on the family and species of the bacterium but on the strain. They are separated by fractional precipitation from protein-free extracts using ethanol. Some bacteria coproduce fructans, which can complicate the isolation of the dextrans.

== Uses ==
Dextran 70 is on the WHO Model List of Essential Medicines, the most important medications needed in a health system.

Medicinally it is used as an antithrombotic (antiplatelet), to reduce blood viscosity, and as a volume expander in hypovolaemia.

=== Microsurgery ===
These agents are used commonly by microsurgeons to decrease vascular thrombosis. The antithrombotic effect of dextran is mediated through its binding of erythrocytes, platelets, and vascular endothelium, increasing their electronegativity and thus reducing erythrocyte aggregation and platelet adhesiveness. Dextrans also reduce factor VIII-Ag Von Willebrand factor, thereby decreasing platelet function. Clots formed after administration of dextrans are more easily lysed due to an altered thrombus structure (more evenly distributed platelets with coarser fibrin). By inhibiting α-2 antiplasmin, dextran serves as a plasminogen activator, so possesses thrombolytic features.

Outside of these features, larger dextrans, which do not pass out of the vessels, are potent osmotic agents, thus have been used urgently to treat hypovolemia. The hemodilution caused by volume expansion with dextran use improves blood flow, thus further improving the patency of microanastomoses and reducing thrombosis. Still, no difference has been detected in antithrombotic effectiveness in comparison with intra-arterial and intravenous administration of dextran.

Dextrans are available in multiple molecular weights ranging from 3 kDa to 2 MDa. The larger dextrans (>60,000 Da) are excreted poorly from the kidney, so remain in the blood for as long as weeks until they are metabolized. Consequently, they have prolonged antithrombotic and colloidal effects. In this family, dextran-40 (MW: 40,000 Da), has been the most popular member for anticoagulation therapy. Close to 70% of dextran-40 is excreted in urine within the first 24 hours after intravenous infusion, while the remaining 30% are retained for several more days.

=== Other medical uses ===
- Dextran is used in some eye drops as a lubricant. and in certain intravenous fluids to solubilize other factors, such as iron (in a solution known as Iron Dextran).
- Intravenous solutions with dextran function both as volume expanders and means of parenteral nutrition. Such a solution provides an osmotically neutral fluid that once in the body is digested by cells into glucose and free water. It is occasionally used to replace lost blood in emergency situations, when replacement blood is not available, but must be used with caution as it does not provide necessary electrolytes and can cause hyponatremia or other electrolyte disturbances.
- Dextran also increases blood sugar levels.
- Dextran can be used in an ATPS for PEGylation

=== Laboratory uses ===
- Dextran is used in the osmotic stress technique for applying osmotic pressure to biological molecules.
- It is also used in some size-exclusion chromatography matrices; an example is Sephadex.
- Dextran has also been used in bead form to aid in bioreactor applications.
- Dextran has been used as an immobilization agent in biosensors.
- Dextran preferentially binds to early endosomes; fluorescent-labelled dextran can be used to visualize these endosomes under a microscope.
- Dextran can be used as a stabilizing coating to protect metal nanoparticles from oxidation and improve biocompatibility.
- Dextran coupled with a fluorescent molecule such as fluorescein isothiocyanate can be used to create concentration gradients of diffusible molecules for imaging and allow subsequent characterization of gradient slope.
- Solutions of fluorescently-labelled dextran can be perfused through engineered vessels to analyze vascular permeability
- Dextran is used to make microcarriers for industrial cell culture
- Orally-administered dextran sodium sulphate, which carries more electric charge than dextran, is used to induce colitis in animal models of inflammatory bowel disease.
- Dextran is a common model compound to test the potential of drug formulations to facilitate intestinal absorption via the paracellular route.

== Side effects ==
Although relatively few side effects are associated with dextran use, these side effects can be very serious. These include anaphylaxis, volume overload, pulmonary edema, cerebral edema, or platelet dysfunction.

An uncommon but significant complication of dextran osmotic effect is acute kidney injury. The pathogenesis of this kidney failure is the subject of many debates with direct toxic effect on tubules and glomerulus versus intraluminal hyperviscosity being some of the proposed mechanisms. Patients with history of diabetes mellitus, chronic kidney disease, or vascular disorders are most at risk. Brooks and others recommend the avoidance of dextran therapy in patients with chronic kidney disease.

== Research ==
Efforts have been made to develop modified dextran polymers. One of these has acetal modified hydroxyl groups. It is soluble in water and in organic solvents. This allows it to be processed in the same manner as many polyesters, like poly(lactic-co-glycolic acid), through processes like solvent evaporation and emulsion. Acetalated dextran is structurally different from acetylated dextran. As of 2017 several uses for drug delivery had been explored in vitro and a few had been tested in animal models.

== See also ==
- Dextran drug delivery systems
- Pentoxifylline
