= Subculture (biology) =

Concept in cell biology or microbiology

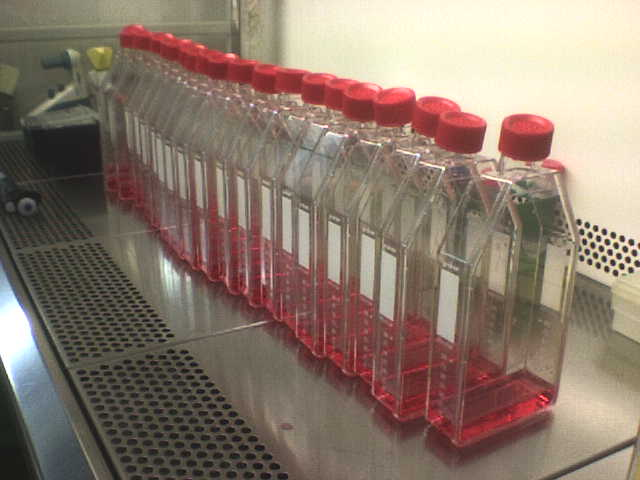
Line of T175 cell culture flasks containing red cell culture medium

In biology, a subculture is either a new cell culture or a microbiological culture made by transferring some or all cells from a previous culture to fresh growth medium. This action is called subculturing or passaging the cells. Subculturing is used to prolong the lifespan and/or increase the number of cells or microorganisms in the culture.

== Role ==
Cell lines and microorganisms cannot be held in culture indefinitely due to the gradual rise in metabolites which may be toxic, the depletion of nutrients present in the culture medium, and an increase in cell count or population size due to growth. Once nutrients are depleted and levels of toxic byproducts increase, microorganisms in culture will enter the stationary phase, where proliferation is greatly reduced or ceased (the cell density value plateaus). When microorganisms from this culture are transferred into fresh media, nutrients trigger the growth of the microorganisms which will go through lag phase, a period of slow growth and adaptation to the new environment, followed by log phase, a period where the cells grow exponentially.

Subculture is therefore used to produce a new culture with a lower density of cells than the originating culture, fresh nutrients and no toxic metabolites allowing continued growth of the cells without risk of cell death. Subculture is important for both proliferating (e.g. a microorganism like E. coli) and non-proliferating (e.g. terminally differentiated white blood cells) cells. Subculturing can also be used for growth curve calculations (ex. generation time) and obtaining log-phase microorganisms for experiments (ex. Bacterial transformation).

Typically, subculture is from a culture of a certain volume into fresh growth medium of equal volume, this allows long-term maintenance of the cell line. Subculture into a larger volume of growth medium is used when wanting to increase the number of cells for, for example, use in an industrial process or scientific experiment.

== Passage number ==
It is often important to record the approximate number of divisions cells have had in culture by recording the number of passages or subcultures. In the case of plant tissue cells, somaclonal variation may arise over long periods in culture. Similarly in mammalian cell lines, chromosomal aberrations have a tendency to increase over time. For microorganisms there is a tendency to adapt to culture conditions, which is rarely precisely like the microorganism's natural environment, which can alter their biology.

== Protocols for passaging ==
The protocol for subculturing cells depends heavily on the properties of the cells involved.

=== Suspension cells ===
Many cell types, in particular, many microorganisms, grow in solution and not attached to a surface. These cell types can be subcultured by simply taking a small volume of the parent culture and diluting it in fresh growth medium. Cell density in these cultures is normally measured in cells per milliliter for large eukaryotic cells, or as optical density for 600nm light for smaller cells like bacteria. The cells will often have a preferred range of densities for optimal growth and subculture will normally try to keep the cells in this range.

=== Adherent cells ===
Adherent cells, for example many mammalian cell lines, grow attached to a surface such as the bottom of a cell culture flask or petri dish. These cell types have to be detached from the surface before they can be subcultured. For adherent cells, cell density is normally measured in terms of confluency, the percentage of the growth surface covered by cells. The cells will often have a known range of confluencies for optimal growth, for example a mammalian cell line like HeLa generally prefers confluencies between 10% and 100%, and subculture will normally try to keep the cells in this range. For subculture, cells may be detached by one of several methods including trypsin treatment to break down the proteins responsible for surface adherence, chelating calcium ions with EDTA which disrupts some protein adherence mechanisms, or mechanical methods like repeated washing or use of a cell scraper. The detached cells are then resuspended in fresh growth medium and allowed to settle back onto their growth surface.

== See also ==
Trypsinization
