= Diana Ross (disambiguation) =

Diana Ross (born 1944) is an American singer, actress, and record producer.

Diana Ross may also refer to:

- Diana Ross (1970 album)
- Diana Ross (1976 album)
- Diana Ross (author), English children's author
- Diana Ross Playground, a playground in New York City which Diana Ross funded
