= Diana Ross Live in Central Park =

Live in Central Park

Video by Diana Ross
- Released: May 15, 2012
- Recorded: July 21 and 22, 1983
- Venue: Central Park (on the Great Lawn) in New York, United States
- Genre: Various
- Length: 1 hour, 48 minutes
- Label: Shout! Factory
- Director: Steve Binder

Diana Ross chronology
Live from Las Vegas (2009)	Live in Central Park (2012)	Diana Ross feat. The Supremes Paris 1968: Broadcast Archives (2013)

Live in Central Park is a DVD by Diana Ross released in 2012 that followed from a July 21, 1983 concert in The Great Lawn of New York City's Central Park, which was cut short by a massive lightning storm. The concert was staged as a benefit to raise funds for a children's park, later known as the Diana Ross Playground, located inside the park at West 81st Street and Central Park West.

The concerts were aired worldwide on the Showtime cable network and a reported crowd of eight-hundred thousand as For One and For All, while being directed by Steve Binder. That concert lasted 45 minutes before the storm. Winds of nearly 50 mph were reported, and electrical power was disrupted for nearly 40,000 homes throughout the NYC metropolitan area during the storm. On July 22, 1983, the New York City Parks Department determined that the ground was dry enough for the crowd to stand on for a second concert, which began at 6pm that evening.

While the concert did not ultimately make a profit due to a number of factors, groundbreaking for the Diana Ross Playground took place in September 1986 after Ross made a personal donation.

These two concerts were part of the Up Front Tour to promote Ross's 1983 album.

TV Land awarded Most Memorable Television Performance in 2006, ABC Network chose it as one of the Top 20 Television Performances and VH1's 100 Greatest Moments on TV.

In 2012, the concert received its first official DVD release through Shout! Factory.

In 2019, the concert had its first public showing in movie theaters across the U.S. and around the world, with collaboration from Fathom Events as part of Ross' Diana Ross: Her Life, Love and Legacy celebration coinciding with her 75th birthday. The footage was digitally remastered and was supplemented with new footage of interviews from Ross’ five children.

== Set list ==
1. "I'm Coming Out"
2. "Home" (Stephanie Mills cover)
3. "Family" (Henry Krieger cover)
4. "It's My House"
5. "Let's Go Up"
6. "Reach Out and Touch (Somebody's Hand)"
7. "Reflections"/"Baby Love"/"Stop! In the Name of Love"/"Love Is Like an Itching in My Heart" (The Supremes cover)
8. "Pieces of Ice"
9. "Lady Sings the Blues" (Billie Holiday cover)/"Ain't Nobody's Business"
10. "I Cried for You" (Abe Lyman & His California Orchestra cover)
11. "God Bless the Child" (Billie Holiday cover)
12. "Mirror, Mirror"
13. "Maniac" (Michael Sembello cover)
14. "You Can't Hurry Love" (The Supremes cover)
15. "Upside Down"
16. "So Close"
17. "Why Do Fools Fall in Love" (Frankie Lymon & The Teenagers cover)
18. "Ribbon in the Sky" (Stevie Wonder cover)
19. "Beat It" (Michael Jackson cover)/"Muscles"
20. "Endless Love"
21. "Theme From Mahogany"/"Ain't No Mountain High Enough" (Marvin Gaye & Tammi Terrell cover)
22. "All for One"
