= I Love You (Diana Ross album) =

Studio album by Diana Ross
- Released: October 2, 2006
- Genre: R&B
- Length: 56:39
- Labels: Angel; Manhattan; Parlophone
- Producers: Peter Asher; Marylata E. Jacobs (co-exec.); Diana Ross (exec.); Steve Tyrell

Diana Ross chronology
Blue (2006)	I Love You (2006)	Diana Ross Sings Songs from The Wiz (2015)

I Love You is the twenty-fourth studio album by American singer Diana Ross. It was released in Europe by Parlophone Records' Angel label in late 2006 and by Manhattan Records in the United States in 2007. It was Ross's first studio album of newly recorded material since Every Day Is a New Day (1999). The album features a number of classic love songs such as Marvin Gaye's "I Want You" (co-written by Ross's brother Arthur), Burt Bacharach's "The Look of Love" and Queen's "Crazy Little Thing Called Love". The only new original song on the album is the title track "I Love You (That's All That Really Matters)" .

Her highest-charting album in over 20 years in the US, it debuted at number 32 on the Billboard 200 and peaked at number 16 on the US Top R&B/Hip-Hop Albums. I Love You also charted in the Netherlands and the United Kingdom. Critical reception toward the album was generally mixed. A special edition format was also released including a DVD featuring behind the scenes footage of the album's production. In support of the album, Ross embarked on the I Love You Tour which began in April 2007 in the United States and eventually visited Europe and Canada.

== Critical reception ==
Professional ratings
Review scores
Source	Rating
AllMusic	2/5 stars
USA Today	2.5/4 stars

AllMusic editor Jeff Tamarkin wrote that "in what might be the least inspired album of her career, iconic diva Diana Ross sleepwalks through a mishmash of seemingly randomly chosen love songs, all covers save for one new composition, adding nothing to them and forcing one to wonder just why she bothered." He found that Ross "puts little emotion or enthusiasm into her recitations here, and seems to have little familiarity with, or understanding of, the songs she and producers Peter Asher and Steve Tyrell have chosen for the album. Her vocals are largely nondescript and at times barely hint at the qualities that made her such a distinctive force for decades, and the arrangements and production are whitewashed and lacking in originality." Steve Jones of USA Today gave I Love You a two-and-a-half-star rating, praising her enduring vocal ability and elegant performances while noting that the album's mix of romantic standards was uneven. He highlighted moments where Ross made songs her own, particularly the title track, while wishing for more original material.

== Commercial performance ==
First released internationally, I Love You debuted and peaked at number 60 on the UK Albums Chart. In North America, the album was released on January 16, 2007. It debuted on the US Billboard 200 as the week's Hot Shot Debut, reaching number 32, with first-weeks sales of 21,222 copies. This marked Ross' highest-charting album since Swept Away peaked at number 26 in late 1984. Other charts I Love You appeared on include the Top R&B/Hip Hop Albums and the Top Internet Albums, reaching number 16 and number 32, respectively. According to Soundscan, as of 2016, the album has sold around 100,000 copies in the United States.

== Track listing ==
US version
No.	Title	Writer(s)	Producer(s)	Length
1.	"Remember"	Harry Nilsson	Peter Asher	3:32
2.	"More Today Than Yesterday"	Pat Upton	Steve Tyrell	2:51
3.	"I Want You"	Arthur "T-Boy" Ross; Leon Ware	Tyrell	4:34
4.	"I Love You (That's All That Really Matters)"	Fred White	Tyrell	5:30
5.	"What About Love"	Brenda Russell; Allee Willis; Stephen Bray	Asher	4:25
6.	"The Look of Love"	Burt Bacharach; Hal David	Asher	4:28
7.	"Lovely Day"	Bill Withers; Skip Scarborough	Asher	4:09
8.	"Take My Breath Away"	Giorgio Moroder; Tom Whitlock	Asher	3:45
9.	"Only You"	Buck Ram; Ande Rand	Tyrell	3:58
10.	"To Be Loved"	Tyran Carlo; Berry Gordy Jr.	Tyrell	4:01
11.	"I Will"	John Lennon; Paul McCartney	Asher	2:48
12.	"This Magic Moment"	Doc Pomus; Mort Shuman	Asher	3:27
13.	"You Are So Beautiful"	Bruce Fisher; Billy Preston	Asher	3:34
14.	"Always and Forever"	Rod Temperton	Asher	4:07
15.	"Remember – Reprise"	Nilsson	Asher	2:50

International version
No.	Title	Writer(s)	Producer(s)	Length
1.	"Remember"	Nilsson	Asher	3:32
2.	"More Today Than Yesterday"	Upton	Tyrell	2:51
3.	"I Want You"	Ross; Ware	Tyrell	4:34
4.	"I Love You (That's All That Really Matters)"	White	Tyrell	5:30
5.	"What About Love"	Russell; Willis; Bray	Asher	4:25
6.	"The Look of Love"	Bacharach; David	Asher	4:28
7.	"Lovely Day"	Withers; Scarborough	Asher	4:09
8.	"Crazy Little Thing Called Love" (featuring Brian May)	Freddie Mercury	Asher	3:15
9.	"Only You"	Ram; Rand	Tyrell	3:58
10.	"To Be Loved"	Carlo; Gordy, Jr.	Tyrell	4:01
11.	"I Will"	Lennon; McCartney	Asher	2:48
12.	"This Magic Moment"	Pomus; Shuman	Asher	3:27
13.	"You Are So Beautiful"	Fisher; Preston	Asher	3:34
14.	"Always and Forever"	Temperton	Asher	4:07
15.	"Remember – Reprise"	Nilsson	Asher	2:50

== Charts ==
Chart (2006–2007)	Peak position
Dutch Albums (Album Top 100)	92
French Albums (SNEP)	187
UK Albums (Official Charts)	60
US Billboard 200	32
US Top R&B/Hip-Hop Albums (Billboard)	16
