= Diana Ross Sings Songs from The Wiz =

Studio album by Diana Ross
- Released: November 27, 2015
- Recorded: 1978
- Genre: Funk; disco; gospel
- Label: Motown/Universal
- Producer: Diana Ross; Suzanne de Passe; Lee Holdridge; Andrew Skurow; George Solomon; Harry Weinger

Diana Ross chronology
I Love You (2006)	Diana Ross Sings Songs from The Wiz (2015)	Thank You (2021)

Diana Ross Sings Songs from The Wiz is an album by Diana Ross, released by Motown Records/Universal on November 27, 2015. The album features Ross' versions of songs from the film version of the musical The Wiz, in which she starred along with Michael Jackson. The songs were originally recorded in 1978, produced by Ross, Suzanne de Passe, and Grammy Award winner Lee Holdridge. Motown originally planned to release the album in 1979 (a year after the film's original soundtrack) but it was canceled following low box-office returns and a highly negative critical response to the film.

Ross recorded new versions of "Be a Lion" and "Home" for the album, together with a previously unreleased song, "Wonder, Wonder Why". Home had been released as part of a 2001 Motown compilation album, while a different version of "Ease On down the Road" had been released in 1978 as a duet with Michael Jackson. All other tracks remained unreleased until 2015. The reissue was remastered and produced by Andrew Skurow, George Solomon, and Harry Weinger.

== Track listing ==
All songs written by Charlie Smalls, unless otherwise noted.

1. "The Feeling We Once Had"
2. "He's the Wizard"
3. "Soon as I Get Home"
4. Trio Medley: "You Can't Win" / "Slide Some Oil" / "(I'm A) Mean Ole Lion"
5. "Ease On down the Road"
6. "Be a Lion"
7. "So You Wanted to Meet the Wizard"
8. "Is This What Feeling Gets? (Dorothy's Theme)" (Quincy Jones, Nick Ashford, Valerie Simpson)
9. "Don't Nobody Bring Me No Bad News"
10. "Wonder Wonder Why"
11. "A Brand New Day" (Luther Vandross)
12. "Believe in Yourself"
13. "Home"

== See also ==
- The Wiz: Original Cast Recording
