= The Essential Diana Ross: Some Memories Never Fade =

- Residency by Diana Ross
- Location: Las Vegas, Nevada, U.S.
- Venue: Venetian Theatre
- Start date: April 1, 2015
- End date: February 25, 2017
- Legs: 3
- No. of shows: 27

Diana Ross concert chronology
- In the Name of Love Tour (2014–17); Some Memories Never Fade (2015–17)

The Essential Diana Ross: Some Memories Never Fade was a concert residency by American singer Diana Ross at The Venetian Las Vegas. The residency features all of the singer's hits with The Supremes and music from her solo career as well.

== Set list ==
The following set list was obtained from the concert held on April 1, 2015. It does not represent all shows during the residency.

1. "I'm Coming Out"
2. "More Today Than Yesterday"
3. "My World Is Empty Without You" / "Where Did Our Love Go" / "Baby Love"
4. "Stop! In The Name Of Love"
5. "You Can't Hurry Love"
6. "Love Child"
7. "The Boss"
8. "Touch Me in the Morning"
9. "Love Hangover" / "Take Me Higher"
10. "Ease On Down The Road"
11. "The Look Of Love"
12. "Endless Love"
13. "Don't Explain"
14. "Theme from Mahogany (Do You Know Where You're Going To)"
15. "Why Do Fools Fall In Love?"
16. "Ain't No Mountain High Enough"
17. "I Will Survive"

Encore

18. Reach Out and Touch (Somebody's Hand)"

== Shows ==
| Date | Attendance | Revenue |
Leg 1
| April 1, 2015 | 15,685 / 15,685 (100%) | $1,755,291 |
| April 3, 2015 | 15,685 / 15,685 (100%) | $1,755,291 |
| April 4, 2015 | 15,685 / 15,685 (100%) | $1,755,291 |
| April 8, 2015 | 15,685 / 15,685 (100%) | $1,755,291 |
| April 9, 2015 | 15,685 / 15,685 (100%) | $1,755,291 |
| April 11, 2015 | 15,685 / 15,685 (100%) | $1,755,291 |
| April 15, 2015 | 15,685 / 15,685 (100%) | $1,755,291 |
| April 17, 2015 | 15,685 / 15,685 (100%) | $1,755,291 |
| April 18, 2015 | 15,685 / 15,685 (100%) | $1,755,291 |
Leg 2
| November 4, 2015 | 15,220 / 15,815 (96%) | $1,783,007 |
| November 6, 2015 | 15,220 / 15,815 (96%) | $1,783,007 |
| November 7, 2015 | 15,220 / 15,815 (96%) | $1,783,007 |
| November 11, 2015 | 15,220 / 15,815 (96%) | $1,783,007 |
| November 13, 2015 | 15,220 / 15,815 (96%) | $1,783,007 |
| November 14, 2015 | 15,220 / 15,815 (96%) | $1,783,007 |
| November 18, 2015 | 15,220 / 15,815 (96%) | $1,783,007 |
| November 20, 2015 | 15,220 / 15,815 (96%) | $1,783,007 |
| November 21, 2015 | 15,220 / 15,815 (96%) | $1,783,007 |
Leg 3
| February 8, 2017 | 13,789 / 15,474 (89%) | $1,681,837 |
| February 10, 2017 | 13,789 / 15,474 (89%) | $1,681,837 |
| February 11, 2017 | 13,789 / 15,474 (89%) | $1,681,837 |
| February 14, 2017 | 13,789 / 15,474 (89%) | $1,681,837 |
| February 17, 2017 | 13,789 / 15,474 (89%) | $1,681,837 |
| February 18, 2017 | 13,789 / 15,474 (89%) | $1,681,837 |
| February 22, 2017 | 13,789 / 15,474 (89%) | $1,681,837 |
| February 24, 2017 | 13,789 / 15,474 (89%) | $1,681,837 |
| February 25, 2017 | 13,789 / 15,474 (89%) | $1,681,837 |
| TOTAL | 44,694 / 46,974 (95%) | $5,220,135 |
