= Blue (Diana Ross album) =

Studio album by Diana Ross
- Released: June 20, 2006
- Recorded: 1971–1972
- Genres: Jazz; R&B
- Length: 50:16
- Label: Motown
- Producer: Gil Askey

Diana Ross chronology
| Love & Life: The Very Best of Diana Ross (2001) | Blue (2006) | I Love You (2006) |

Singles from Blue
- 1. "What a Diff'rence a Day Makes" Released: 2006

Blue, originally titled The Blue Album, is the twenty-third studio album by American singer Diana Ross. Initially recorded between late 1971 and early 1972, it was released as Ross' twenty-third studio album by Motown Records on June 20, 2006. Overseen by Ross' musical director Gil Askey, the jazz-flavored album was originally conceived as a follow-up to her soundtrack to the 1972 American biographical drama film Lady Sings the Blues in which Ross starred. Berry Gordy and Motown subsequently decided to shelve the album, and Ross' next release was the more pop-oriented Touch Me in the Morning (1973).

== Critical reception ==
Professional ratings
Review scores
| Source | Rating |
|---|---|
| About.com | 3.5/5 stars |
| All About Jazz | (favorable) |
| Allmusic | 4/5 stars |
| Entertainment Weekly | B+ |
| Metro Weekly | (mixed) |
| PopMatters | 7/10 stars |
| Rolling Stone | 2/5 stars |

Allmusic editor Rob Theakston found that "Gil Askey's arrangements are top-notch without sounding like dinner theater knock-offs. Blue is an album every bit as bold an artistic statement as her contemporaries Stevie Wonder and Marvin Gaye, who were recording the opuses Where I'm Coming From and What's Going On around the same time, and for Ross fans, Blue is every bit as enjoyable as her sultriest moments as the supreme Supreme."

== Chart performance ==
Blue was initially sold through Starbucks' US stores for the first 30 days of release, though the coffeehouse chain immediately sold out of its supply nationwide. On the charts, Blue peaked at number two on the US Billboard Top Jazz Albums, also logging a single week on the Billboard 200 at number 146. Its final sales figure was slightly higher than 80,000 US copies.

== Track listing ==
All songs produced and conducted by Gil Askey.

| No. | Title | Writer(s) | Length |
|---|---|---|---|
| 1. | "What a Diff'rence a Day Makes" | Stanley Adams; María Méndez Grever | 3:28 |
| 2. | "No More" | Salvador Camarata; Bob Russell | 3:09 |
| 3. | "Let's Do It" | Cole Porter | 3:00 |
| 4. | "I Loves Ya Porgy" | George Gershwin; Ira Gershwin; DuBose Heyward | 5:11 |
| 5. | "Smile" | Charlie Chaplin; Geoffrey Parsons; John Turner | 2:58 |
| 6. | "But Beautiful" | Johnny Burke; Jimmy Van Heusen | 2:50 |
| 7. | "Had You Been Around" | Richard Jacques; Ronald Miller; Avery Vandenburg; Bernard Yuffy | 3:29 |
| 8. | "Little Girl Blue" | Lorenz Hart; Richard Rodgers | 4:00 |
| 9. | "Can't Get Started with You" | Vernon Duke; I. Gershwin | 3:10 |
| 10. | "Love Is Here to Stay" | George Gershwin; Ira Gershwin | 2:13 |
| 11. | "You've Changed" | Bill Carey; Carl Fischer | 2:54 |
| 12. | "My Man" | Jacques Charles; Channing Pollock; Albert Willemetz; Maurice Yvain | 3:31 |
| 13. | "Easy Living" | Ralph Rainger; Leo Robin | 2:54 |
| 14. | "(In My) Solitude" | Eddie DeLange; Duke Ellington; Irving Mills | 2:05 |
| 15. | "He's Funny That Way" | Charles N. Daniels; Richard Whiting | 3:02 |
| 16. | "T'Ain't Nobody's Bizness If I Do" | Porter Grainger; Everett Robbins | 2:22 |

Notes

- Tracks 10–16 were originally recorded for Lady Sings the Blues (1972) but some were left out of the movie or were included in different versions.

== Personnel ==
- Gil Askey – Conductor, Musical Arrangements, Producer
- Oliver Nelson, Benny Golson – Arrangements
- Guy Costa – Engineer
- Cal Harris Sr. – Engineer
- Michele Horie – Producer, Artwork
- Harry Langdon – Photography, Cover Photo
- Pat Lawrence – Executive Producer
- Ralph Lotten – Assistant
- Bill MacMeeken – Engineer
- Larry Miles – Engineer
- John B. Norman – Engineer
- Ryan Null – Photo Coordination
- Kevin Reeves – Mastering, Mixing
- David Ritz – Liner Notes
- Greg Ross – Design
- George Solomon – Consultant
- Art Stewart – Engineer
- Russ Terrana – Engineer
- Harry Weinger – Liner Notes, Compilation Producer

== Charts ==
| Chart (2006) | Peak position |
|---|---|
| US Billboard 200 | 146 |
| US Top Jazz Albums (Billboard) | 2 |
| US Top R&B/Hip-Hop Albums (Billboard) | 71 |
