= More Today Than Yesterday: The Greatest Hits Tour =

2010–12 concert tour by Diana Ross

- Tour by Diana Ross
- Promotional poster for the tour
- Start date: May 15, 2010
- End date: April 28, 2012
- Legs: 5
- No. of shows: 76 in North America

Diana Ross concert chronology
- I Love You Tour (2006–08); More Today Than Yesterday: The Greatest Hits Tour (2010–12); In the Name of Love Tour (2013–17)

The More Today Than Yesterday: The Greatest Hits Tour is a concert tour by American recording artist Diana Ross. Primarily visiting the United States and Canada, the tour showcases Ross' greatest hits that span her nearly 50 years in the music industry. The tour was well received by critics and fans. The first leg of the tour earned over four million dollars, finishing at 66th place on Pollstar's "Top 100 North American Tours".

== Background ==
The tour was announced in March 2010 as a summer tour, visiting over 17 cities in the United States. Due to public demand, the tour was expanded in the fall of 2010 to include additional dates in the U.S. and Canada. Further expansion came in 2011 with an additional 17 dates planned. To introduce the tour, Ross stated, "We work our way up: The ’60s — The Supremes — the 70's and the ’80s and 'I’m Coming Out' [...] The music is timeless, I must say, especially the Motown music; it's timeless and it's really special."

== Set list ==
2010

Leg 1

1. "The Boss"
2. "More Today Than Yesterday"
3. "Reflections"
4. "Come See About Me"^{1}
5. "You Can't Hurry Love"
6. "You Keep Me Hangin' On"
7. "Stop! In the Name of Love"
8. "It's Hard for Me to Say"
9. "Love Child"
10. Medley: "I'm Coming Out" / "Upside Down"
11. "Touch Me in the Morning"
12. "It's My House"
13. "What About Love"
14. Medley: "Love Hangover" / "Take Me Higher" / "Ease On down the Road"
15. "The Look of Love"
16. "Fine and Mellow"
17. "Don't Explain"
18. "Why Do Fools Fall in Love"
19. "Chain Reaction"^{1}
20. "Endless Love"
21. "Theme from Mahogany (Do You Know Where You're Going To)"
22. "Ain't No Mountain High Enough"
23. "I Will Survive"

Encore

22. "Missing You"^{1} (contains excerpts from "You Are Not Alone")
23. "Reach Out and Touch (Somebody's Hand)"
24. "I Love You (That's All That Really Matters)"

^{1}Performed at select dates

Leg 2

1. "I'm Coming Out"
2. "More Today Than Yesterday"
3. "My World Is Empty Without You"
4. "Where Did Our Love Go"
5. "Baby Love"
6. "Stop! In the Name of Love"
7. "You Can't Hurry Love"
8. "Love Child"
9. "The Boss"
10. "Upside Down"
11. "Touch Me in the Morning"
12. "It's My House"
13. "Love Hangover"
14. "The Look of Love"
15. "Good Morning Heartache"
16. "Why Do Fools Fall in Love"
17. "Theme from Mahogany (Do You Know Where You're Going To)"
18. "Ain't No Mountain High Enough"

Encore

19. "I Will Survive"
20. "Reach Out and Touch (Somebody's Hand)"
2011
1. "I'm Coming Out"
2. "More Today Than Yesterday"
3. "My World Is Empty Without You"
4. "Where Did Our Love Go"
5. "Baby Love"
6. "Stop! In the Name of Love"
7. "You Can't Hurry Love"
8. "Love Child"
9. "The Boss"
10. "Upside Down"
11. "Touch Me in the Morning"
12. "It's My House"
13. Medley: "Love Hangover" / "Take Me Higher" / "Ease On down the Road"
14. "The Look of Love"
15. "Fine and Mellow"
16. "Don't Explain"
17. "Why Do Fools Fall in Love"
18. "Theme from Mahogany (Do You Know Where You're Going To)"
19. "Ain't No Mountain High Enough"
20. "I Will Survive"

Encore

21. "I Love You
22. "Reach Out and Touch (Somebody's Hand)"
2012
1. "I'm Coming Out"
2. "More Today Than Yesterday"
3. "My World Is Empty Without You"
4. "Where Did Our Love Go"
5. "Baby Love"
6. "Stop! In the Name of Love"
7. "You Can't Hurry Love"
8. "Touch Me in the Morning"
9. "Love Child"
10. "The Boss"
11. "Upside Down"
12. "It's My House"
13. Medley: "Love Hangover" / "Take Me Higher" / "Ease On down the Road"
14. "Fine and Mellow"
15. "Don't Explain"
16. "Why Do Fools Fall in Love"
17. "Theme from Mahogany (Do You Know Where You're Going To)"
18. "Ain't No Mountain High Enough"
19. "I Will Survive"

Encore

21. "Reach Out and Touch (Somebody's Hand)"

== Tour dates ==
Date	City	Country	Venue
North America—Leg 1
May 15, 2010	Boston	United States	Wang Theatre
May 16, 2010	Mashantucket	United States	MGM Grand Theater
May 18, 2010	Red Bank	United States	Count Basie Theatre
May 19, 2010	New York City	United States	Radio City Music Hall
May 21, 2010	Atlantic City	United States	Circus Maximus Theater
May 25, 2010	North Bethesda	United States	Music Center at Strathmore
May 27, 2010	Chicago	United States	Chicago Theatre
May 28, 2010	Cleveland	United States	State Theatre
May 29, 2010	Detroit	United States	Fox Theatre
May 31, 2010	Toronto	Canada	Roy Thomson Hall
June 2, 2010	Knoxville	United States	Tennessee Theatre
June 4, 2010	Atlanta	United States	Chastain Park Amphitheater
June 5, 2010^{[A]}	Memphis	United States	Memphis Botanic Garden
June 6, 2010	St. Louis	United States	Fox Theatre
June 9, 2010	Los Angeles	United States	Nokia Theatre L.A. Live
June 11, 2010	San Diego	United States	Humphrey's Concerts by the Bay
June 12, 2010	Saratoga	United States	Mountain Winery Amphitheater
North America—Leg 2
September 11, 2010	Calgary	Canada	Stampede Corral
September 14, 2010	Brookville	United States	Tilles Center for the Performing Arts
September 15, 2010	Albany	United States	Palace Theatre
September 17, 2010	Orillia	Canada	Casino Rama Entertainment Centre
September 18, 2010	Orillia	Canada	Casino Rama Entertainment Centre
September 21, 2010	Dayton	United States	Mead Theatre
November 12, 2010	Paradise	United States	The Colosseum at Caesars Palace
November 13, 2010	Paradise	United States	The Colosseum at Caesars Palace
November 16, 2010	Naples	United States	Naples Philharmonic Center for the Arts
November 17, 2010	Sarasota	United States	Van Wezel Performing Arts Hall
November 19, 2010	Melbourne	United States	King Center for the Performing Arts
November 20, 2010	Clearwater	United States	Ruth Eckerd Hall
November 21, 2010	Hollywood	United States	Hard Rock Live
North America—Leg 3
February 25, 2011	Choctaw	United States	The Arena at Golden Moon
February 26, 2011	Bossier City	United States	Riverdome
February 27, 2011	Austin	United States	Moody Theater
March 1, 2011	Houston	United States	Verizon Wireless Theater
March 2, 2011	Dallas	United States	Majestic Theatre
March 4, 2011	Jacksonville	United States	Moran Theater
March 5, 2011	Greenville	United States	Peace Concert Hall
March 7, 2011	Charleston	United States	Dock Street Theatre
March 9, 2011	Charlotte	United States	McGlohon Theatre
March 11, 2011	Durham	United States	Durham Performing Arts Center
March 12, 2011^{[B]}	Washington, D.C.	United States	Washington Convention Center
March 13, 2011	Poughkeepsie	United States	Bardavon 1869 Opera House
March 15, 2011	Englewood	United States	Bergen Performing Arts Center
March 16, 2011	Hartford	United States	Mortensen Hall
March 18, 2011	Stamford	United States	Palace Theatre
March 19, 2011	Atlantic City	United States	Circus Maximus Theater
March 20, 2011	Staten Island	United States	St. George Theatre
North America—Leg 4
September 9, 2011	Indio	United States	Fantasy Springs Special Events Center
September 11, 2011	Temecula	United States	Pechanga Showroom Theater
September 13, 2011	San Diego	United States	Humphrey's Concerts by the Bay
September 14, 2011	Livermore	United States	Wente Vineyards Outdoor Theatre
September 16, 2011	San Francisco	United States	Golden Gate Theatre
September 17, 2011	San Rafael	United States	Marin Veterans' Memorial Auditorium
September 19, 2011	Salt Lake City	United States	EnergySolutions Arena
September 20, 2011	Denver	United States	Wells Fargo Theatre
September 22, 2011	Concho	United States	Lucky Star Casino Events Center
September 23, 2011	Thackerville	United States	Global Event Center
September 27, 2011	Columbus	United States	Ohio Theatre
September 28, 2011	Rochester	United States	Rochester Auditorium
September 30, 2011	Wilkes-Barre	United States	Kirby Center for Performing Arts
October 1, 2011	Reading	United States	Sovereign Performing Arts Center
October 2, 2011	Morristown	United States	Mayo Performing Arts Center
October 4, 2011	Worcester	United States	Hanover Theatre for the Performing Arts
North America—Leg 5
February 23, 2012	Hollywood	United States	Hard Rock Live
February 24, 2012	St. Petersburg	United States	Mahaffey Theater
February 25, 2012^{[C]}	Orlando	United States	Universal Music Plaza Stage
February 27, 2012	Naples	United States	Naples Philharmonic Center for the Arts
February 28, 2012	Fort Pierce	United States	Sunrise Theatre
March 1, 2012	Atlanta	United States	Fox Theatre
March 2, 2012	Nashville	United States	Ryman Auditorium
March 3, 2012	Cherokee	United States	Harrah's Cherokee Event Center
March 22, 2012	Los Angeles	United States	Nokia Theatre L.A. Live
April 21, 2012	Biloxi	United States	Beau Rivage Theatre
April 22, 2012	Memphis	United States	Orpheum Theatre
April 24, 2012	Indianapolis	United States	Murat Theatre
April 26, 2012	Louisville	United States	Louisville Palace
April 27, 2012	Hammond	United States	The Venue at Horseshoe Casino
April 28, 2012^{[D]}	St. Louis	United States	Peabody Opera House

Festivals and other miscellaneous appearances
^{A} This concert was a part of the "Live at the Garden" concert series
^{B} This concert was a part of the "25th Annual Leukemia Ball"
^{C} This concert was a part of "Universal Studios Mardi Gras"
^{D} This concert is a part of the "Young Variety Night of the Rising Stars"

Cancellations and rescheduled shows

September 15, 2011	Yountville, California	Lincoln Theatre	Cancelled

=== Box office score data ===
Venue	City	Tickets sold / available	Gross revenue
Radio City Music Hall	New York City	5,974 / 5,974 (100%)	$519,335
Circus Maximus Theater	Atlantic City	3,155 / 3,169 (99%)	$253,323
Chicago Theatre	Chicago	3,517 / 3,517 (100%)	$277,071
Fox Theatre	Detroit	3,232 / 4,493 (72%)	$209,501
Nokia Theatre L.A. Live	Los Angeles	5,397 / 5,728 (94%)	$351,196
The Colosseum at Caesars Palace	Paradise	6,439 / 8,069 (80%)	$480,680
Ruth Eckerd Hall	Clearwater	1,965 / 1,965 (100%)	$167,106
Riverdome	Bossier City	1,338 / 1,338 (100%)	$143,462
Durham Performing Arts Center	Durham	2,642 / 2,642 (100%)	$192,347
Sovereign Performing Arts Center	Reading	1,328 / 1,774 (75%)	$130,850
Fox Theatre	Atlanta	3,793 / 4,412 (86%)	$260,975
Ryman Auditorium	Nashville	2,263 / 2,263 (100%)	$233,311
Harrah's Cherokee Event Center	Cherokee	2,671 / 3,000 (89%)	$256,045
The Venue at Horseshoe Casino	Hammond	2,350 / 2,516 (93%)	$187,640
TOTAL		46,064 / 50,860 (90%)	$3,662,842

== Critical reception ==
The first leg of the tour received positive feedback from music critics. Jim Farber (New York Daily News) praised the performance at the Radio City Music Hall noting, "In fact, the show found her quite engaged, banishing the cynicism so many well-seasoned stars betray on their nine millionth run through the hits. (If you want to see that sort of cynicism, buy a ticket to the next Aretha Franklin concert). By contrast, Ross seemed entirely present, delivering full versions of the hits instead of the usual bum's rush of medleys. Then again, most of these songs last no more than 3 minutes, so that wasn't exactly a Herculean feat." Emily Stokes (Financial Times) gave the same concert four out of five stars. She wrote, "A final rendition of "You Are Not Alone" secured her place as the fairy godmother of Motown. "If you need me, call me", she advised the audience, before leaving the stage to change out of her final, silver dress."

Jane Stevenson (Toronto Sun) gave the performance at the Roy Thomson Hall four out of five stars writing, "Even her eyes were big as she stared out into the audience and took them through her impressive 50-year career of Motown soul, blues, gospel, disco, and pop starting with the ho-hum late ‘70s hit The Boss and before quickly moving into Supremes era-gold like "More Today Than Yesterday", Reflections, You Can’t Hurry Love, Stop In The Name of Love, You Keep Me Hanging On, and the granddaddy of them all – Love Child." Mark Jordan (Go Memphis) described Ross' performance at the Memphis Botanic Garden "regal". He further commented, "And at the center of it all was Ross — commanding the stage, pulling off quick costume changes, and keeping the show's breakneck pace on time — setting a pace that would have left even her younger, modern-day successors like Beyoncé winded."

Greg Haymes (Times Union) stated Ross throw out her "diva" attitude for the concert at the Palace Theatre. He wrote, "Ross was in fine voice throughout the evening, and she got sensuous and sultry with Bert Bacharach's classic 'The Look of Love' and a pair of Billie Holiday gems -- the bluesy 'Fine and Mellow' and 'Don't Explain'—but she didn't really make them her own the way she did with 'Touch Me in the Morning.' Those who attended the show at Hard Rock Live agreed with Veda Jo Jenkins (The Palm Beach Post). She stated, "From the club classic to the love ballads like "Touch Me in the Morning", Ross’ performance was old school. No fanfare, no big video screens with hi-def graphics, just her solo with an outrageous horn section that truly accentuated her voice and the mood."
