= I Love You Tour =

2006–08 concert tour by Diana Ross

- Tour by Diana Ross
- Associated album: I Love You
- Start date: October 30, 2006
- End date: May 31, 2008
- Legs: 5
- No. of shows: 3 in Australia; 34 in North America; 9 in Europe; 56 total

Diana Ross concert chronology
- This Is It Tour (2004); I Love You Tour (2006–08); More Today Than Yesterday (2010–12)

The I Love You Tour was a concert tour by American singer Diana Ross in support of her twenty-fourth studio album, I Love You. The tour began in October 2006 in Australia and eventually visited North America and Europe.

== Opening act ==
- Anthony Callea (Australia)

== Setlist ==
The following setlist is obtained from the November 4, 2007 concert, held at the Paramount Theatre in Oakland, California. It does not represent all concerts during the tour.

1. "Overture" (contains elements of "Take Me Higher")
2. "I'm Coming Out"
3. "My World Is Empty Without You" / "Where Did Our Love Go" / "Baby Love" / "Stop! In the Name of Love" / "You Can't Hurry Love"
4. "Instrumental Sequence"
5. "Touch Me in the Morning"
6. "Love Hangover"
7. "The Boss"
8. "It's My House"
9. "Love Child"
10. "What About Love"
11. "I'm Still Waiting"
12. "Upside Down"
13. "Ease On down the Road"
14. "Instrumental Sequence"
15. "Fine and Mellow"
16. "Don't Explain"
17. "Why Do Fools Fall in Love"

Encore

18. "Theme from Mahogany (Do You Know Where You're Going To)"
19. "Ain't No Mountain High Enough"
20. "I Will Survive"

== Tour dates ==
Date	City	Country	Venue
Australia
October 30, 2006	Melbourne	Australia	Regent Theatre
November 1, 2006^{[A]}	Melbourne	Australia	Flemington Racecourse Forum
November 3, 2006	Sydney	Australia	Capitol Theatre
North America
April 5, 2007	Mashantucket	United States	Fox Theater
April 6, 2007	New York City	United States	WaMu Theatre
April 7, 2007	Atlantic City	United States	Borgata Event Center
April 9, 2007	Red Bank	United States	Count Basie Theatre
April 11, 2007	Niagara Falls	Canada	Avalon Ballroom
April 12, 2007	Niagara Falls	Canada	Avalon Ballroom
April 13, 2007	Mount Pleasant	United States	Soaring Eagle Concert Hall
April 14, 2007	Chicago	United States	Chicago Theatre
April 16, 2007	Auburn Hills	United States	The Palace of Auburn Hills
April 19, 2007	Grand Prairie	United States	Nokia Live at Grand Prairie
April 20, 2007^{[B]}	Hidalgo	United States	Dodge Arena
April 21, 2007^{[C]}	Beaumont	United States	Beaumont Civic Center
April 22, 2007	Marksville	United States	Mári Center Showroom
April 24, 2007	Hollywood	United States	Hard Rock Live
April 25, 2007	Melbourne	United States	King Center for the Performing Arts
April 26, 2007	Clearwater	United States	Ruth Eckerd Hall
April 28, 2007^{[D]}	Plymouth	Trinidad and Tobago	Plymouth Recreational Grounds
April 30, 2007	Hollywood	United States	Hard Rock Live
Europe
May 6, 2007	Birmingham	England	NEC Arena
May 8, 2007	Nottingham	England	Nottingham Arena
May 9, 2007	London	England	Wembley Arena
May 11, 2007	Dublin	Ireland	Point Theatre
May 16, 2007	Newcastle	England	Metro Radio Arena
May 17, 2007	Glasgow	Scotland	Scottish Exhibition and Conference Centre
May 19, 2007	Rotterdam	Netherlands	Rotterdam Ahoy Sportpaleis
May 20, 2007	Brussels	Belgium	Forest National
May 21, 2007	Paris	France	Palais des Sports
North America
November 1, 2007	Valley Center	United States	The Pavilion
November 3, 2007	Santa Rosa	United States	Wells Fargo Center for the Arts
November 4, 2007	Oakland	United States	Paramount Theatre
November 6, 2007	Phoenix	United States	Maricopa County Events Center
November 8, 2007	Santa Ynez	United States	Samala Showroom
November 9, 2007	Reno	United States	Grand Theatre
November 15, 2007	Highland	United States	San Manuel Casino Concert Venue
November 16, 2007	Indio	United States	Fantasy Springs Special Events Center
November 20, 2007	Los Angeles	United States	Gibson Amphitheatre
May 18, 2008	Winnipeg	Canada	Centennial Concert Hall
May 20, 2008	Edmonton	Canada	Northern Alberta Jubilee Auditorium
May 21, 2008	Calgary	Canada	Southern Alberta Jubilee Auditorium
May 23, 2008	Richmond	Canada	River Rock Show Theatre
May 24, 2008	Richmond	Canada	River Rock Show Theatre
May 30, 2008	Rama	Canada	Casino Rama Entertainment Centre
May 31, 2008	Rama	Canada	Casino Rama Entertainment Centre

Festivals and other miscellaneous appearances
^{A} Melbourne Cup Carnival Chairman's Dinner
^{B} Benefit for El Centro Cultural Mexicano
^{C} Benefit for the Christus Health Foundation
^{D} Plymouth Jazz Festival
