= List of awards and nominations received by Diana Ross =

Diana Ross awards and nominations
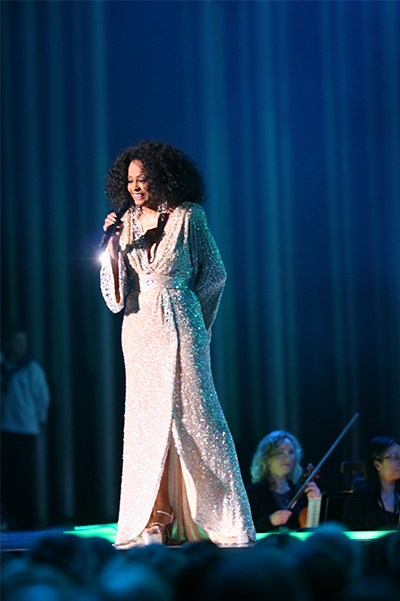
- Diana Ross at the Nobel Peace prize Concert, Oslo Spektrum.
Awards and nominations
Award	Wins	Nominations
American Music Awards	8	9
Golden Globe	1	3
Grammy	2	13
Academy Awards	0	1
Tony Awards	1	1

Below is a list of awards, accolades and recognitions that singer Diana Ross has won throughout her long career in show business both as member of The Supremes and her solo career.

== Academy Awards ==
Year	Nominee / work	Award	Result
1973	Lady Sings the Blues	Best Actress	Nominated

== American Music Awards ==
The American Music Awards is an annual music awards ceremony and one of several major annual American music awards shows. Ross has won seven American Music Awards out of nine nominations.

Year	Nominee / work	Award	Result
1974	Lady Sings the Blues	Favorite Pop/Rock Album	Won
1975	Herself	Favorite Soul/R&B Female Vocalist	Won
1977	Herself	Favorite Soul/R&B Female Vocalist	Nominated
1981	Herself	Favorite Soul/R&B Female Vocalist	Won
1981	"Upside Down"	Favorite Soul/R&B Single	Won
1982	"Endless Love"	Favorite Soul/R&B Single (Duet)	Won
1982	"Endless Love"	Favorite Pop/Rock Single (Duet)	Won
1983	Herself	Favorite Soul/R&B Female Vocalist	Won
1986	Herself	Favorite Soul/R&B Female Vocalist	Nominated
2017	Herself	Lifetime Achievement Award	Honored

== BAFTA Film Awards ==
Year	Nominee / work	Award	Result
1973	Lady Sings the Blues	Best Actress	Nominated

== Billboard Award ==
Year	Nominee / work	Award	Result
1976	Herself	Female Entertainer of the Century	Won

== Cable Ace Awards ==
Year	Nominee / work	Award	Result
1981	Diana Ross	General Entertainment (Music)	Won

== Cue Magazine ==
Year	Nominee / work	Award	Result
1973	Herself	Entertainer of the Year	Won

== Golden Globe Awards ==
Year	Nominee / work	Award	Result
1973	Herself	Most Promising Newcomer, Female	Won
1973	Lady Sings The Blues	Best Actress	Nominated
1995	Out of Darkness	Best Performance by an Actress in a Mini-Series or Motion Picture Made for TV	Nominated

== Grammy Awards ==
The Grammy Awards are awarded annually by the National Academy of Recording Arts and Sciences of the United States. Ross has received 13 nominations and was the recipient of the Grammy Lifetime Achievement Award in 2012 and 2023 (as a member of the Supremes).

Year	Nominee / work	Award	Result
1965	"Baby Love" (as part of the Supremes)	Best Rhythm & Blues Recording	Nominated
1966	"Stop In The Name Of Love" (as part of the Supremes)	Best Contemporary Rock & Roll Group Vocal Performance	Nominated
1971	"Ain't No Mountain High Enough"	Best Female Contemporary Vocal Performance	Nominated
1972	"Call Me"	Best Female R&B Vocal Performance	Nominated
1974	"Touch Me in the Morning"	Best Pop Female Vocal Performance	Nominated
1977	"Love Hangover"	Best R&B Female Vocal Performance	Nominated
1978	"Your Love Is So Good for Me"	Best R&B Female Vocal Performance	Nominated
1979	"Ease On down the Road" with Michael Jackson	Best R&B Vocal Performance by a Duo or Group	Nominated
1981	"Upside Down"	Best R&B Female Vocal Performance	Nominated
1982	"Endless Love" with Lionel Richie	Best Pop Vocal Performance by a Duo or Group	Nominated
1982	"Endless Love" with Lionel Richie	Record of the Year	Nominated
1983	"Muscles"	Best R&B Female Vocal Performance	Nominated
2012	Herself	Lifetime Achievement Award	Honored
2023	Thank You	Best Traditional Pop Vocal Album	Nominated
2023	The Supremes	Lifetime Achievement Award	Honored

Note: "We Are the World" (which featured Diana Ross as a vocalist) also won Song of the Year, Record of the Year, Best Music Video, Short Form, and Best Pop Performance by a Duo or Group with Vocal in 1986. Song of the Year is credited to the songwriters and not the performer, The song was written by Michael Jackson and Lionel Richie. Record of the Year and Best Pop Performance by a Duo or Group were presented to the producer in 1986, the song was produced by Quincy Jones. Best Music Video, Short Form is presented to the director and producer, Tom Trbovich directed the video while Quincy Jones served as producer.

== NAACP Image Awards ==
Year	Nominee / work	Award	Result
1970	Herself	Female Entertainer of the Year	Won
1972	Lady Sings The Blues	Outstanding Actress in a Motion Picture	Won

== New York Film Critics ==
Year	Nominee / work	Award	Result
1973	Lady Sings The Blues	Best Actress	Nominated

== People's Choice Award ==
Year	Nominee / work	Award	Result
1976	Herself	Favorite Motion Picture Actress	Nominated
1980	Herself	Favorite Pop Singer	Nominated

== TV Land Awards ==
Year	Nominee / work	Award	Result
2006	1983 Concert in Central Park	Most Memorable TV Performance	Won

== Saturn Awards ==
Year	Nominee / work	Award	Result
1978	The Wiz	Best Actress	Nominated

== Soul Train Awards ==
Year	Nominee / work	Award	Result
1995	Herself	Heritage Award	Honored
1996	Herself	Hall of Fame	Inducted
2022	Herself	Soul Train Certified Award	Nominated

== Tony Awards ==
Year	Nominee / work	Award	Result
1977	An Evening With Diana Ross	Special Tony Award	Won

== Miscellaneous honors ==
Year	Organization	Award	Nominated work	Result
1982	Hollywood Walk of Fame - solo star located at 6712 Hollywood Blvd, Hollywood, CA.		Herself	Inducted
1988	Rock & Roll Hall of Fame		The Supremes	Inducted
1993	Guinness Book of World Records	Most Successful Female Singer of All Time	Herself	Recognized
1994	Hollywood Walk of Fame - with the Supremes located at 7060 Hollywood Blvd, Hollywood, CA		The Supremes	Inducted
1994	MIDEM (World Music Market)	Lifetime Achievement Award	Herself	Honored
1994	Commander of the Order of Arts and Letters (Commandeur de l'ordre des Arts et des Lettres) France's recognition of significant contributions to the arts		Herself	Honored
1996	World Music Awards	Lifetime Achievement Award	Herself	Honored
1998	Songwriter's Hall of Fame	The Hitmaker Award	Herself	Won
1999	BET Walk of Fame		Herself	Won
1999	National Academy of Recording Arts and Sciences (NARAS)	Heroes Award	Herself	Won
2002	British Hit Singles & Albums	Top 100 Artists of All Time	Herself	Recognized
2003	UK Capital Awards	Legendary Female Artist	Herself	Won
2003	National Association of Black Owned Broadcasters	Lifetime Achievement Award	Herself	Honored
2007	BET Music Awards	Lifetime Achievement Award	Herself	Honored
2017	Presidential Medal of Freedom		Herself	Honored
2017	Michigan Women's Hall of Fame		Herself	Inducted

- 2007 - Kennedy Center Honors - John F. Kennedy Center for the Performing Arts for her contribution to entertainment
- 2014 - Golden Plate Award of the American Academy of Achievement presented by Awards Council members George Lucas and Mayor Willie Brown in San Francisco.

== See also ==
- Diana Ross, the main article
