= Oprah Winfrey's Legends Ball =

Three-day celebration held in 2005 by Oprah Winfrey

- "Young'uns" recite Pearl Cleage's poem We Speak Your Name to the "Legends" (2005). From left to right: Ashanti, Janet Jackson, Alicia Keys, Mariah Carey, Mary J. Blige, Missy Elliott

Oprah Winfrey's Legends Ball was a three-day celebration in 2005 held by Oprah Winfrey honoring twenty-five African-American women in art, entertainment, and civil rights.

The celebration, held at Winfrey's Santa Barbara, California, estate, included a private luncheon, an evening white-tie ball, with additional guests, and a Sunday-morning gospel brunch on the final day. On May 22, 2006, a year after the celebration, a one-hour program about the weekend aired on ABC. It included celebrity attendee interviews, behind-the-scenes moments, and footage showing the lead-up to and preparations before the day of the event.

The 25 legendary and trailblazing women honored were activist-author-poet Maya Angelou, gospel singer Shirley Caesar, actress Diahann Carroll, artist-sculptor Elizabeth Catlett, actress Ruby Dee, dancer Katherine Dunham, singer Roberta Flack, singer Aretha Franklin, poet Nikki Giovanni, civil rights activist Dorothy Height, actress-singer Lena Horne, civil rights leader Coretta Scott King, singer Gladys Knight, singer Patti LaBelle, author Toni Morrison, civil rights activist Rosa Parks, opera vocalist Leontyne Price, actress-singer Della Reese, singer Diana Ross, model-author Naomi Sims, singer Tina Turner, actress Cicely Tyson, activist-author Alice Walker, singer Dionne Warwick, and jazz singer Nancy Wilson.

== Legends luncheon ==
These women, who have been meaningful to so many of us over the years, are legends who have been magnificent in their pioneering and advancing of African-American women. It is because of their steps that our journey has no boundaries.

— Oprah Winfrey

ABC advertised its television program about this event by describing the luncheon as follows:

The historic weekend began Friday with a private luncheon at [Winfrey]'s Montecito home where the "legends" were greeted by the "young'uns" -- acclaimed stars, including Alicia Keys, Ashanti, Angela Bassett, Halle Berry, Mary J. Blige, Brandy, Naomi Campbell, Mariah Carey, Natalie Cole, Kimberly Elise, Missy Elliott, Tyra Banks, Iman, Janet Jackson, Phylicia Rashad, Debbie Allen, Alfre Woodard [and] Yolanda Adams[,] among others. Throughout the weekend, the "young'uns" paid homage to the "legends" for their great contributions. World-renowned event planner Colin Cowie attended to every detail, and Grammy Award-winner John Legend performed his hit song, "Ordinary People".

During the luncheon, Oprah called-forward poet and author Pearl Cleage, whom had written a special poem in the legends' honor titled "We Speak Your Names". The poem featured passages mentioning the names of the legends, followed by the repeated phrase "we speak your names". The words paid tribute to the legends' many accomplishments, not only in entertainment but in American society and the fight for justice and civil rights. One-by-one, many of the "young'uns"—including Alfre Woodard, Angela Bassett, Ashanti, Halle Berry, Mariah Carey, Mary J. Blige and Missy Elliott—were also called to the front of the outdoor room to recite verses from the emotional and retrospective poem (which each guest received published copy of). At the end of the luncheon, Oprah surprised her guests with a parting gift: the "legends" received black diamond drop-earrings while the "young'uns" received diamond hoop-earrings.

== White-tie ball ==
ABC advertised its television program about this event by describing the ball as follows:

On Saturday night, it was an elegant white-tie Legends Ball with notable guests, including Sidney Poitier, Michelle and (then Senator) Barack Obama, Tom Cruise, Katie Holmes, Dr.Rudolph.Kermit King from The Bahamas, Usher, Barbra Streisand, James Brolin, Lionel Richie, John Travolta, Kelly Preston, Diane Sawyer, Mike Nichols, Maria Shriver, Chris Tucker, Barbara Walters, Quincy Jones, Spike Lee and Tyler Perry, among many others.

== Sunday brunch ==
ABC advertised its television program about this event by describing the brunch as follows:

The finale of the Legends weekend was Sunday's exuberant gospel brunch featuring Walter, Edwin, Lynette, and Tramaine Hawkins with spontaneous performances by, among others, Shirley Caesar, Patti LaBelle, Gladys Knight, Dionne Warwick and Chaka Khan.
