= Diana Ross =

American singer and actress (born 1944)

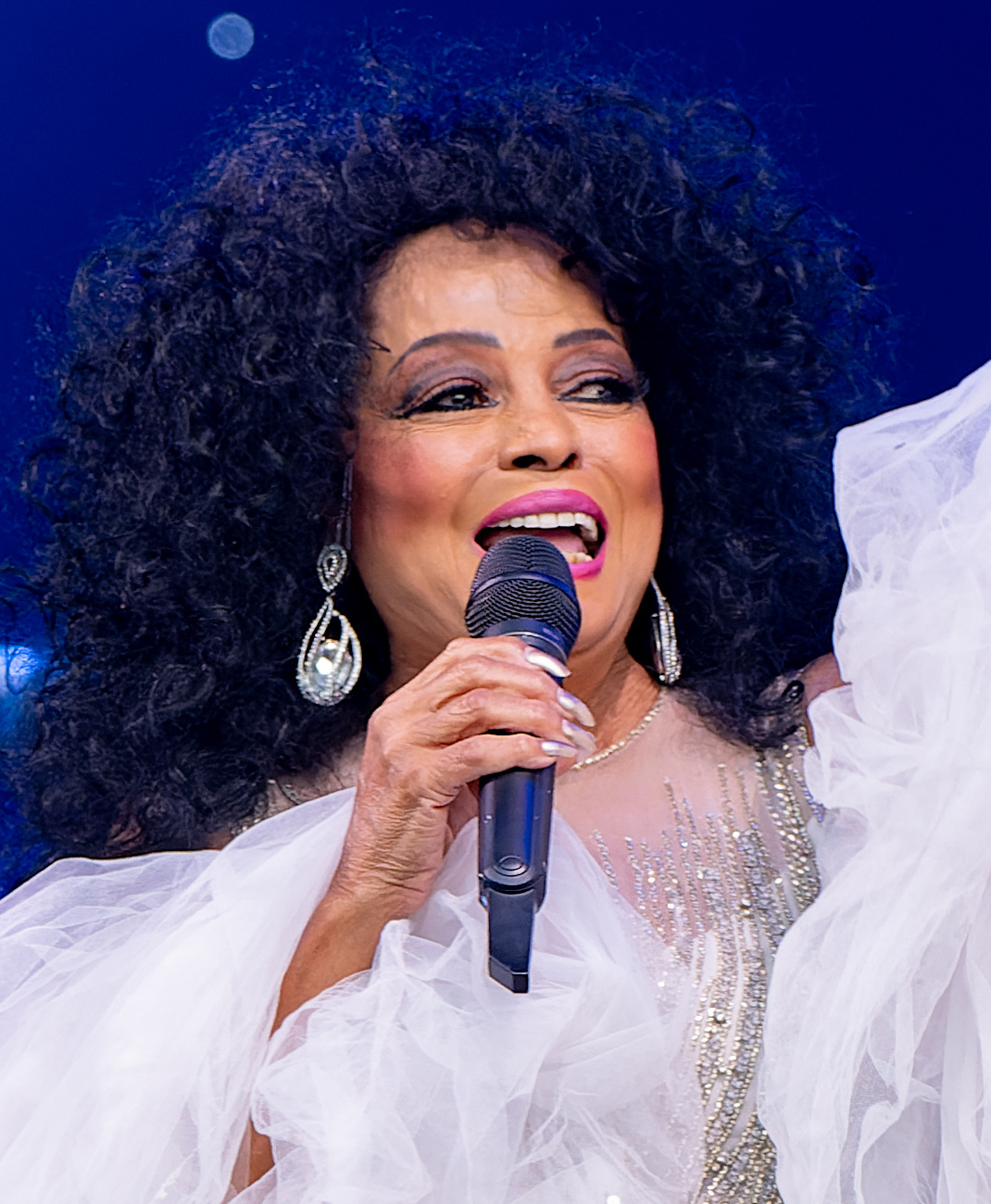
- Ross in 2022
- Born: Diana Ernestine Earle Ross; March 26, 1944 (age 82); Detroit, Michigan, U.S.
- Occupations: Singer; actress
- Years active: 1959–present
- Notable work: Discography
- Spouses: Robert Ellis Silberstein (m. 1971; div. 1977) Arne Næss Jr. (m. 1986; div. 2000)
- Children: 5, including Rhonda, Tracee & Evan
- Relatives: Barbara Ross-Lee (sister); Arthur Ross (brother); Rodney Kendrick (son-in-law); Ashlee Simpson (daughter-in-law)
- Awards: Full list
- Musical career
- Genres: R&B; pop; disco; dance
- Labels: Motown; RCA; EMI; Parlophone; Decca
- Formerly of: The Supremes
- Website: dianaross.com

Diana Ernestine Earle Ross (American English: /daɪˈænə ˈrɑːs/; UK: /ˈrɒs/; born March 26, 1944) is an American singer and actress. She was the lead singer of the vocal group the Supremes, who became Motown's most successful act during the 1960s and one of the world's best-selling girl groups of all time, with a total of 12 number-one pop singles on the U.S. Billboard Hot 100.

Following her departure from the Supremes in 1970, Ross embarked on a successful solo career with the release of her eponymous debut solo album. Between 1972 and 1980, Ross recorded four top ten albums with her most successful studio release being the album Diana. In a fifteen-year span, Ross recorded twelve top ten singles with six – "Ain't No Mountain High Enough", "Touch Me in the Morning", "Theme from Mahogany (Do You Know Where You're Going To)", "Love Hangover", "Upside Down" and "Endless Love" – topping the Billboard Hot 100, making her the female solo act with the most number-one songs in the United States at the time. Ross achieved international success with later songs such as "I'm Coming Out", "Chain Reaction", "If We Hold on Together", and "When You Tell Me That You Love Me".

Ross has also achieved mainstream success and recognition as an actress. Her first role was her Golden Globe Award-winning and Academy Award-nominated portrayal of Billie Holiday in the film Lady Sings the Blues (1972), which made her the first African-American actress to receive an Academy Award nomination for a debut film performance. The film's soundtrack became her only solo album to reach number-one on the U.S. Billboard 200 chart. She also starred in two other feature films, Mahogany (1975) and The Wiz (1978), and later appeared in the television films Out of Darkness (1994), for which she was nominated for a Golden Globe Award, and Double Platinum (1999).

Ross has sold over 100 million records worldwide as a solo artist, making her one of the best-selling music artists of all time. Between 1964 and 1981, Ross sang on eighteen number one US singles. In 2021, Billboard ranked her the 30th greatest charting artist of all time on the Billboard Hot 100. Her hits as a Supreme and a solo artist combined put Ross among the top-five artists on the Billboard Hot 100 singles chart from 1955 to 2018. She has scored a top 75 U.K. hit single for a record 33 consecutive years (1964–1996). In 1988, Ross was inducted to the Rock and Roll Hall of Fame as a member of the Supremes, and is one of the rare performers to have two stars on the Hollywood Walk of Fame. She is the recipient of a Special Tony Award in 1977, the Kennedy Center Honors in 2007, the Grammy Lifetime Achievement Award in 2012 and 2023 (becoming the first woman to win the award twice, the latter as a member of the Supremes), and the Presidential Medal of Freedom in 2016.

== Early life ==
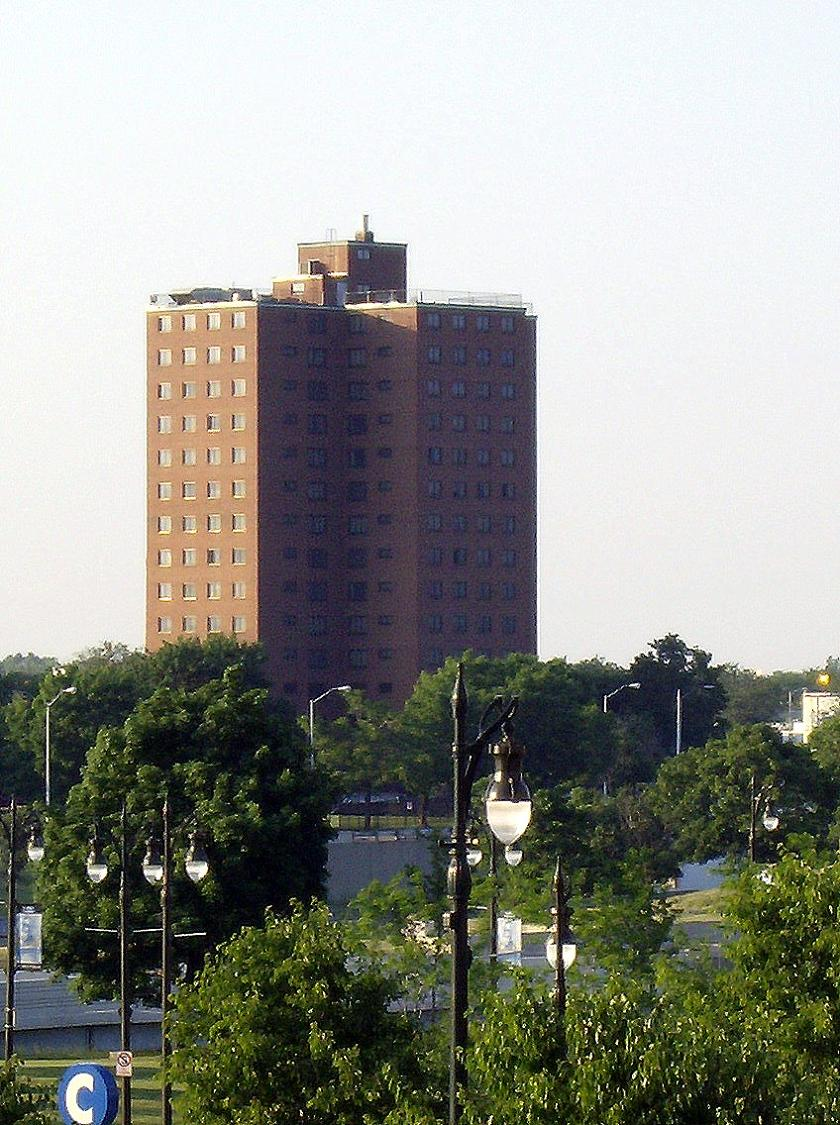
The building that was part of the Brewster-Douglass Housing Projects in Detroit, where Ross spent her teenage years

Diane Ernestine Earle Ross was born on March 26, 1944, in Detroit, Michigan. She was the second of six children born to Ernestine (née Moten; January 27, 1916 – October 9, 1984) and Fred Ross Sr. (July 4, 1920 – November 21, 2007). Her mother named her Diane, but the birth certificate was mistakenly filled out with the name Diana. Her family and Detroit friends have continued to call her Diane. At the time she was born the family lived in Black Bottom. Ross grew up with two sisters (Barbara and Rita) and three brothers: Arthur; Fred Jr.; and Wilbert, also known as Chico. Ross was raised Baptist.

Ross and her family resided at 635 Belmont St., in the North End section of Detroit, near Highland Park, Michigan, where her neighbor was Smokey Robinson. When Ross was seven, her mother contracted tuberculosis, causing her to become seriously ill. Ross's parents sent their children to live with Ernestine's parents, the Reverend (pastor of Bessemer Baptist Church) and Mrs. William Moten in Bessemer, Alabama. After her mother recovered, she and her siblings returned to Detroit.

On her 14th birthday, in 1958, her family relocated to the working-class Brewster-Douglass Housing Projects, settling at St. Antoine Street. Ross attended Cass Technical High School, a four-year college and preparatory magnet school, in downtown Detroit, and, aspiring to become a fashion designer, she took classes in clothing design, millinery, pattern making, and tailoring. In the evenings and on weekends she also took modeling and cosmetology classes and participated in several of the school's extracurricular activities, including its swim team. (Note: Ross has written that Robinson loaned her the funds required to attend these) In 1960, Hudson's downtown Detroit store hired Ross as its first African-American bus girl. For extra income, she also provided hairdressing services to her neighbors. Ross graduated from Cass Tech in January 1962.

== Career ==
=== 1959–1970: The Supremes ===
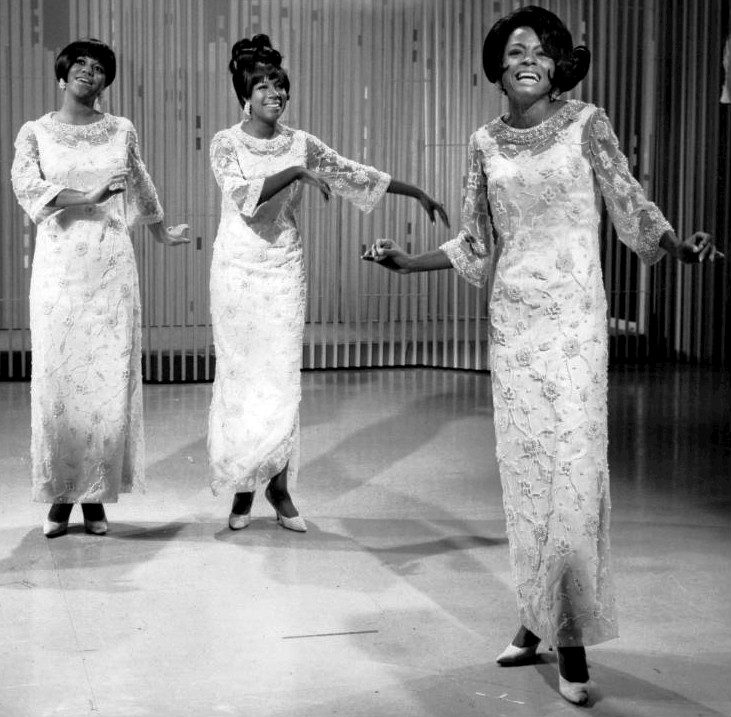
Ross (far right) performing with the Supremes, as lead singer in 1966

At fifteen, Ross joined the Primettes, the sister group to a male vocal group called the Primes, after she had been brought to the attention of music manager Milton Jenkins by Primes member Paul Williams. Among the other members of the Primettes were Florence Ballard, (Note: The first group member hired by Jenkins) Mary Wilson, and Betty McGlown, Williams's girlfriend. After the Primettes won a talent competition in 1960 in Windsor, Ontario, A&R executive and songwriter, Robert Bateman invited them to audition for Tamla Records. (Note: At the time the Primettes began seeking a deal, the label went by the name of Tamla Records; the Motown imprint wouldn't be established until July 1960.)

Prior to the Bateman offer, Ross had approached her former neighbor Smokey Robinson about setting up the audition. In turn, Robinson agreed as long as they allowed him and his group, the Miracles, to hire the Primettes' guitarist, Marv Tarplin, whom Ross had discovered, for an upcoming tour. Tarplin ended up playing in Robinson's band(s) for the next 30-plus years. In her autobiography, Secrets of a Sparrow, Ross wrote that she felt that this had been "a fair trade".

According to Berry Gordy in his autobiography, To Be Loved, he recalled that he had been heading to a business meeting when he happened to hear Ross singing "There Goes My Baby", and that Ross's voice "stopped me in my tracks". He approached the group and asked them to perform it again, but, after learning how young they were, Gordy advised them to finish high school before trying to get signed by Motown. (Note: Not too long after the Primettes' first audition, Gordy signed Mary Wells to his Motown imprint. Wells was 17 years old at the time but had graduated from high school.)

With help from Richard Morris, the group recorded two tracks for Lu Pine Records, with Ross singing lead on one of them. During this time, the group began coming to Gordy's Hitsville U.S.A. headquarters every day, offering to provide extra help for Motown's recordings, often including hand claps and background vocals. During the group's early years, Ross served as its hairstylist, make-up artist, seamstress, and costume designer.

In late 1960, having replaced McGlown with Barbara Martin, the Primettes were allowed to record their own songs at Hitsville, including the doo-wop ballads "After All", "I Want a Guy" and "Who's Loving You". In January 1961, Gordy agreed to sign the group on the condition they change their name. Songwriter and Motown secretary Janie Bradford approached Florence Ballard, the only group member at the studio at the time, to pick out a new name for the group. Ballard chose "Supremes", reportedly, because it was the only name on the list that did not end with "ette". Upon hearing the new name, the other members were not impressed, with Ross telling Ballard she feared the group would be mistaken for a male vocal group (a male vocal group was, indeed, named the Supremes). Gordy signed the group under their new name on the Motown imprint on January 15, 1961.

The group reduced to a trio in 1962 after Martin left the group. In late 1963, the group had their first hit with "When the Lovelight Starts Shining Through His Eyes", peaking at No. 23 on the Billboard Hot 100 pop chart. At the end of the year, Gordy made Ross the group's lead singer.

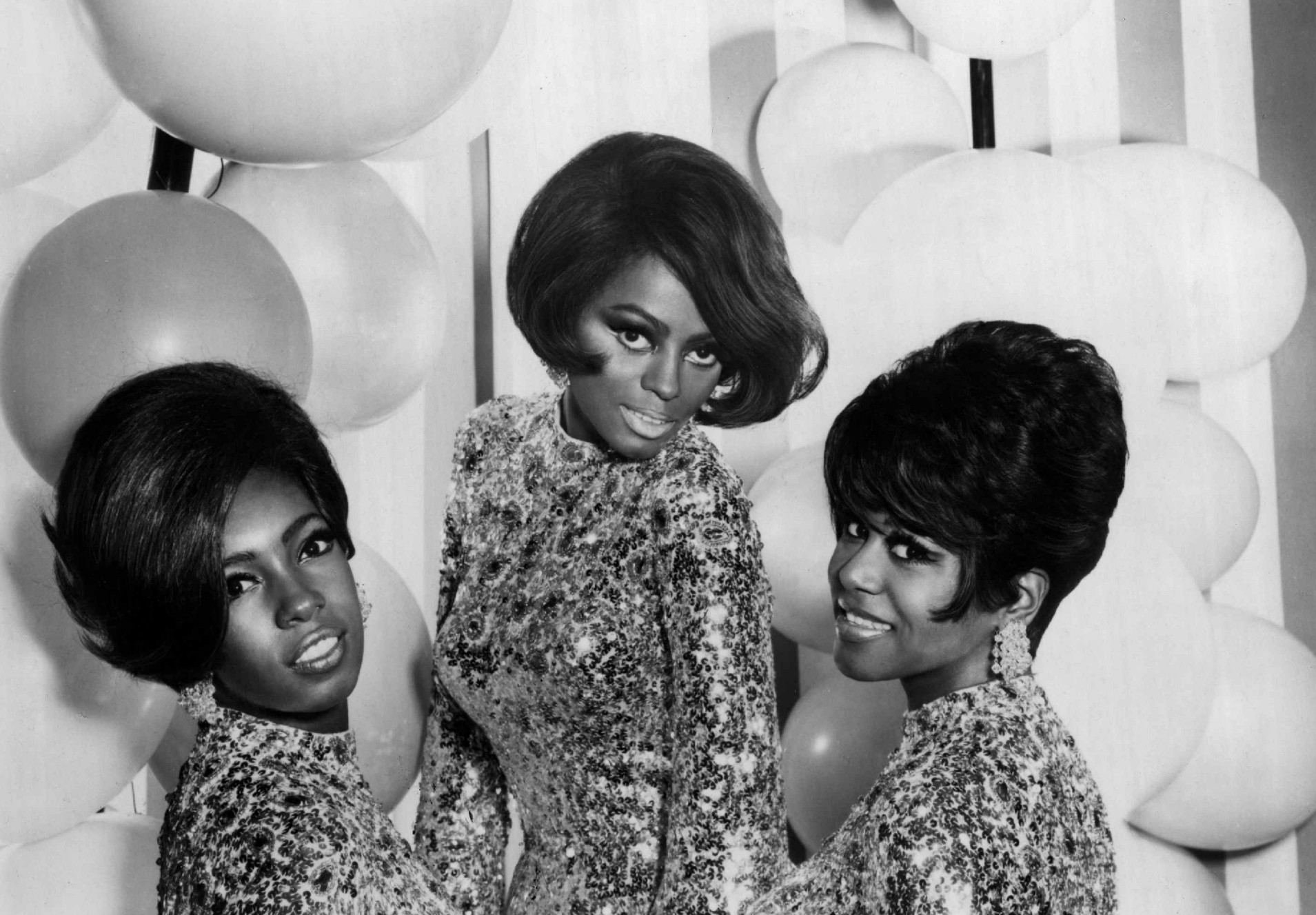
Ross (center) with the Supremes in 1967

In June 1964, while on tour with Dick Clark's Cavalcade of Stars, the group scored their first number-one hit with "Where Did Our Love Go", paving the way for unprecedented success. Between August 1964 and May 1967, Ross, Wilson, and Ballard sang on ten number-one hit singles, all of which also made the UK Top 40. The group became a hit with audiences domestically and abroad, going on to be Motown's most successful vocal act throughout the sixties.

Ross began to dominate interviews with the media, answering questions aimed at Ballard or Wilson. She pushed for more pay than her colleagues. In 1965, she began using the name Diana from the mistake on her birth certificate, surprising Ballard and Wilson who had only known her as Diane. Following difficulties with comportment, weight, and alcoholism, Florence Ballard was fired from the Supremes by Gordy in July 1967, hiring Cindy Birdsong from Patti LaBelle and the Bluebelles as Ballard's replacement. Gordy renamed the group Diana Ross & the Supremes, making it easier to charge a larger performance fee for a solo star and a backing group, as it did for other renamed Motown groups. Gordy initially considered having Ross leave the Supremes for a solo career in 1966, eventually changing his mind because he felt the group's success was still too significant for Ross to pursue solo obligations. Ross remained with the Supremes until early 1970.

As the lead voice of the Supremes, she was really only the soul—or perhaps élan vital—of a machine, ready to plug into whatever arrangement, lyric, or show dress Berry Gordy and the Motown organization provided. She sang of the pain of love without appearing to suffer, but, that doesn't mean that the catch-phrases—'You keep me hanging on,' 'Where did our love go?' 'Love is like an itching in my heart, and I can't scratch it'—were softened or somehow corrupted. Instead, they were transcended with the vivacity that is Diana Ross's great gift. No matter how she is stylized, no matter what phony truism she mouths, this woman always lets you know she is alive.

— Robert Christgau, 1973

The group appeared as a trio of singing nuns in a 1968 episode of the popular NBC TV series Tarzan. Between their early 1968 single "Forever Came Today" and their final single with Ross, "Someday We'll Be Together", Ross would be the only Supremes member to be featured on many of their recordings, often accompanied by session singers the Andantes or, as in the case of "Someday We'll Be Together", Julia and Maxine Waters and Johnny Bristol. Still, Wilson and Birdsong continued to sing on recordings. Gordy drove Ross relentlessly throughout this period and Ross, due to anxiety arising from Gordy's demands, began suffering from anorexia nervosa, according to her autobiography, Secrets of a Sparrow. During a 1967 performance in Boston, Massachusetts, Ross collapsed onstage and had to be hospitalized for exhaustion.

In 1968, Ross began to perform as a solo artist on television specials, including the Supremes' own specials such as TCB and G.I.T. on Broadway, The Dinah Shore Show, and a Bob Hope special, among others. In mid-1969, Gordy decided that Ross would depart the group by the end of that year, and Ross began recording her initial solo work that July. One of the first plans for Ross to establish her own solo career was to publicly introduce a new Motown recording act.

Though she did not claim their discovery, Motown's publicity department credited Ross with having discovered the Jackson 5. Ross would introduce the group during several public events, including The Hollywood Palace. In November, Ross confirmed a split from the Supremes in Billboard. Ross's presumed first solo recording, "Someday We'll Be Together", was eventually released as a Supremes recording and became the group's final number-one hit on the Hot 100. It was also the final number-one Billboard Hot 100 single of the 1960s. Ross made her final appearance with the Supremes at the Frontier Hotel in Las Vegas, Nevada on January 14, 1970.

=== 1970–1980: Solo career and films ===
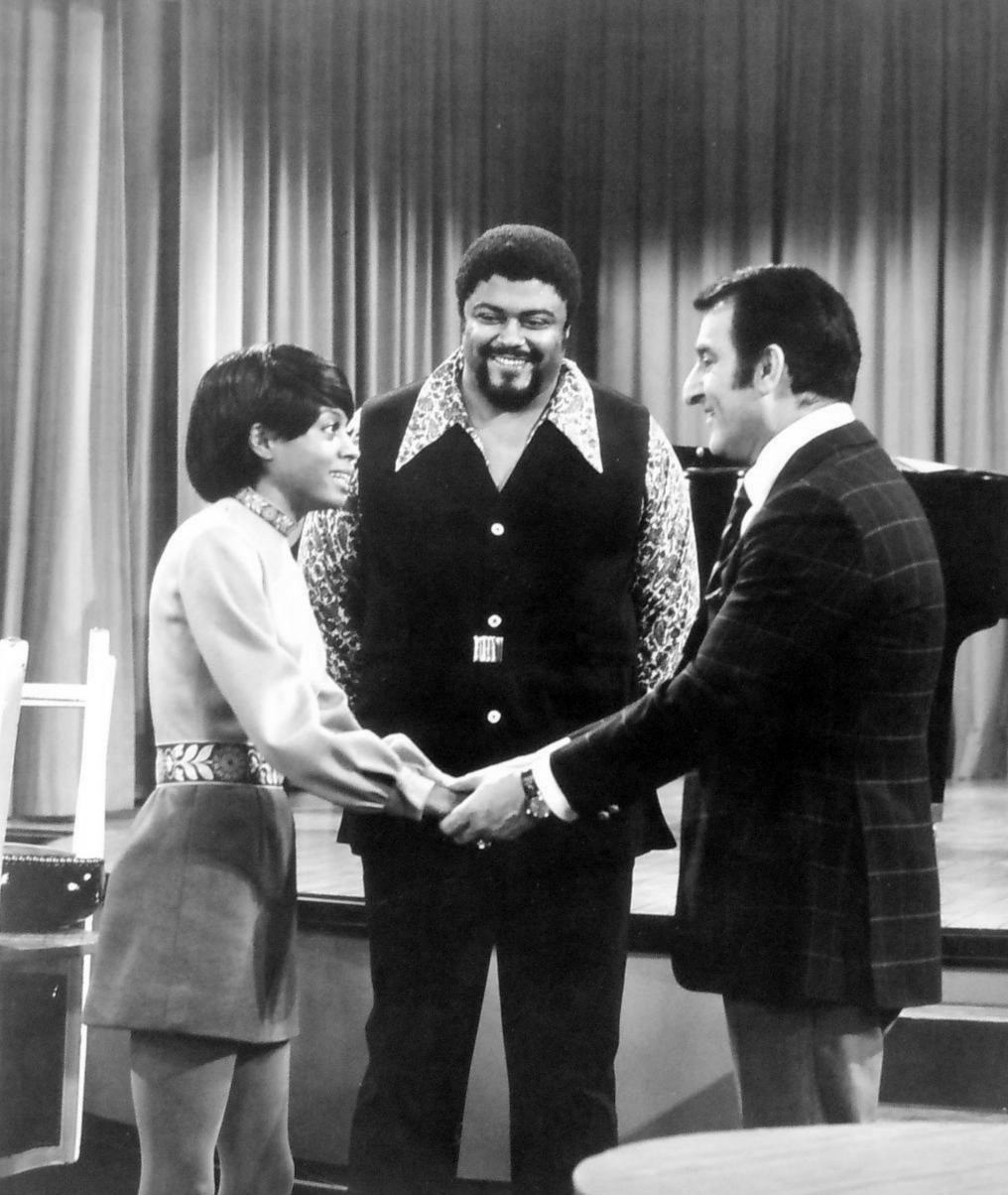
Ross as a guest star with football player and actor Rosey Grier, on the Danny Thomas television program Make Room for Granddaddy in 1971

In May 1970, Ross released her eponymous debut solo album. While her debut solo single, "Reach Out and Touch (Somebody's Hand)", was a moderate top 20 hit, her second single, a striking new arrangement of Ashford & Simpson's "Ain't No Mountain High Enough" became her first number-one solo single on the Billboard Hot 100 and was her first song to receive a Grammy nomination. Despite the debut's success, Ross only experienced moderate US chart success with her two subsequent studio albums, Everything Is Everything and Surrender.

Ross's chart success was much more impressive in the UK where she scored her first number one solo hit there with the soul ballad "I'm Still Waiting". In the first two years of her solo career, Ross recorded five top 20 UK singles and four top ten singles out of six releases. Later in 1971, Ross starred in her first solo television special, Diana!, which included the Jackson 5.

In 1972, Ross made her first film venture with Lady Sings the Blues, a loosely based biography on singer Billie Holiday. Following its opening that October, Ross won critical acclaim for her performance in the film. Jazz critic Leonard Feather, a friend of Holiday's, praised Ross for "expertly capturing the essence of Lady Day". Ross's role in the film won her Golden Globe Award and Academy Award nominations for Best Actress. The soundtrack to Lady Sings the Blues became just as successful, reaching number one on the Billboard 200, staying there for two weeks, and selling two million units. In November 1972, Ross sung the song "When We Grow Up" for the children's album, Free to Be... You and Me.

In 1973, three years after her first US chart-topper, Ross returned to the top of the US pop charts with the Michael Masser-produced ballad "Touch Me in the Morning". Its subsequent parent album of the same name became her first top ten album on the Billboard 200. Later in the year, a highly anticipated duet album with label mate Marvin Gaye, Diana & Marvin, found international success.

During her first solo world tour that year, Ross became the first entertainer in Japan's history to receive an invitation to the Imperial Palace for a private audience with the Empress Nagako, wife of Emperor Hirohito. In April 1974, Ross became the first African-American woman to co-host the Academy Awards, with John Huston, Burt Reynolds, and David Niven.

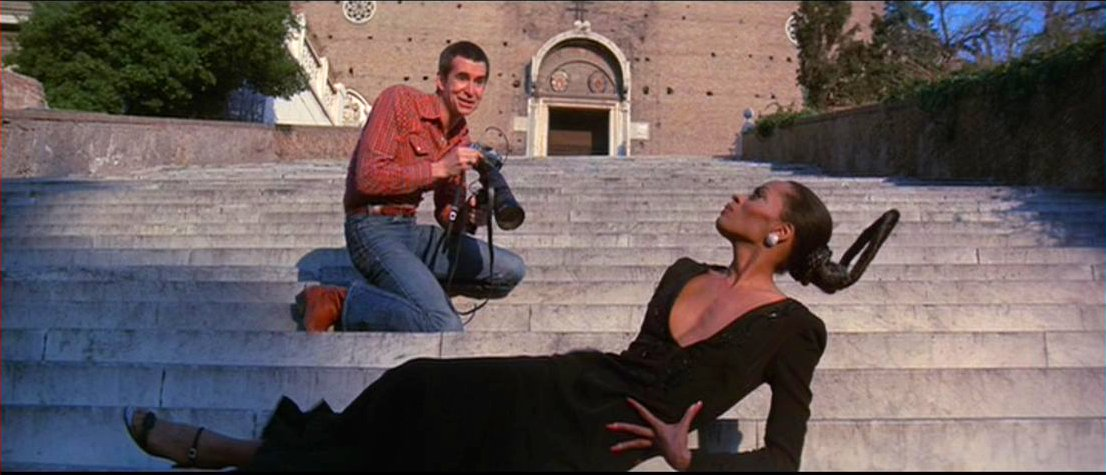
Actor Anthony Perkins photographing Ross in the film trailer for Mahogany (1975)

Ross returned to the big screen with her second film, Mahogany, in 1975. The film reunited her with Billy Dee Williams, her co-star in Lady Sings the Blues and featured costumes designed by Ross herself. The story of an aspiring fashion designer who becomes a runway model and the toast of the industry, Mahogany was a troubled production from its inception. The film's original director, Tony Richardson, was fired during production, and Berry Gordy took over as director. Gordy and Ross clashed during filming, with Ross leaving the production before shooting was completed, forcing Gordy to use secretary Edna Anderson as a body double for Ross.

While a box-office success, the film was not well received by the critics: Time magazine's review of the film chastised Gordy for "squandering one of America's most natural resources: Diana Ross". Nonetheless, Ross had her third number-one hit in the U.S. with the film's theme song "Theme from Mahogany (Do You Know Where You're Going To)" in January 1976.

In May 1976, Ross scored her fourth solo number-one hit, "Love Hangover", a sensual, dramatic mid-tempo song that bursts into an uptempo disco tune. Ross launched her "An Evening with Diana Ross" tour later that year. The tour's success led to a two-week stint at Broadway's Palace Theatre and a 90-minute, Emmy-nominated television special of the same name, featuring special make-up effects by Stan Winston, for a scene in which Ross portrayed legendary cabaret artist Josephine Baker and blues singers Bessie Smith and Ethel Waters. Due to this success, Ross was honored with a Special Tony Award.

Ross struggled with her next two albums, Baby It's Me (1977) and Ross (1978), which failed to produce a hit single.

Around this period, Motown had acquired the film rights to the Broadway play The Wiz, an African-American reinterpretation of L. Frank Baum's The Wonderful Wizard of Oz. The film initially was to include the stage actors who had performed on the play, but producer Rob Cohen could not garner the interest of any major Hollywood film studios. It was not until Ross convinced Cohen to cast her (Note: instead of Stephanie Mills, who portrayed Dorothy on Broadway) as Dorothy that Universal Pictures agreed to finance the production.

This casting decision led to a change in the film's script, in which Dorothy went from a schoolgirl to a schoolteacher. The role of the Scarecrow, also performed by someone else onstage, was eventually given to Ross's former Motown labelmate, Michael Jackson. The Ross-Jackson duet of "Ease On down the Road" won the duo a Grammy nomination.

The film adaptation of The Wiz had been a $24 million production, but upon its October 1978 release, it earned only $21,049,053 at the box office. Though pre-release television broadcast rights had been sold to CBS for over $10 million, the film produced a net loss of $10.4 million for Motown and Universal. At the time, it was the most expensive film musical ever made. The film's failure ended Ross's short career in the big screen and contributed to the Hollywood studios' reluctance to produce the all-black film projects which had become popular during the blaxploitation era of the early to mid-1970s for several years.

Ross released her tenth studio album, The Boss, in 1979. The Ashford & Simpson-produced album was her biggest success in three years and resulted in her very first gold-certified album. (Note: Until 1978, Motown wasn't a member of the Recording Industry Association of America. Ross had recorded albums that sold between half a million to two million copies but remain uncertified.) The title song was her first top 20 pop hit since "Love Hangover" and also topped the dance charts. On July 16, 1979, Ross guest-hosted an episode of Johnny Carson's The Tonight Show, featuring Lynda Carter, George Carlin, and Muhammad Ali as guests. Later that year, Ross hosted the HBO special, Standing Room Only, filmed at Caesars Palace's Circus Maximus Theater in Las Vegas, Nevada, during her "Tour '79" concert tour. This concert special is noted for its opening, during which Ross literally makes her entrance through a movie screen. In November of that year, Ross performed "The Boss" as a featured artist during the Macy's Thanksgiving Day Parade, in New York City.

In 1980, Ross released her most successful album to date, Diana. Composed by Chic's guitarist Nile Rodgers and bassist Bernard Edwards, the album included the hits "I'm Coming Out" and "Upside Down", the latter becoming her fifth chart-topping single in the U.S. Ross scored a Top 10 hit in late 1980 with the theme song to the film It's My Turn. Continuing her connections with Hollywood, Ross recorded the duet ballad "Endless Love", with Lionel Richie. The song would become her sixth and final single to reach number one on the Billboard Hot 100.

=== 1981–1987: Leaving Motown and RCA years ===
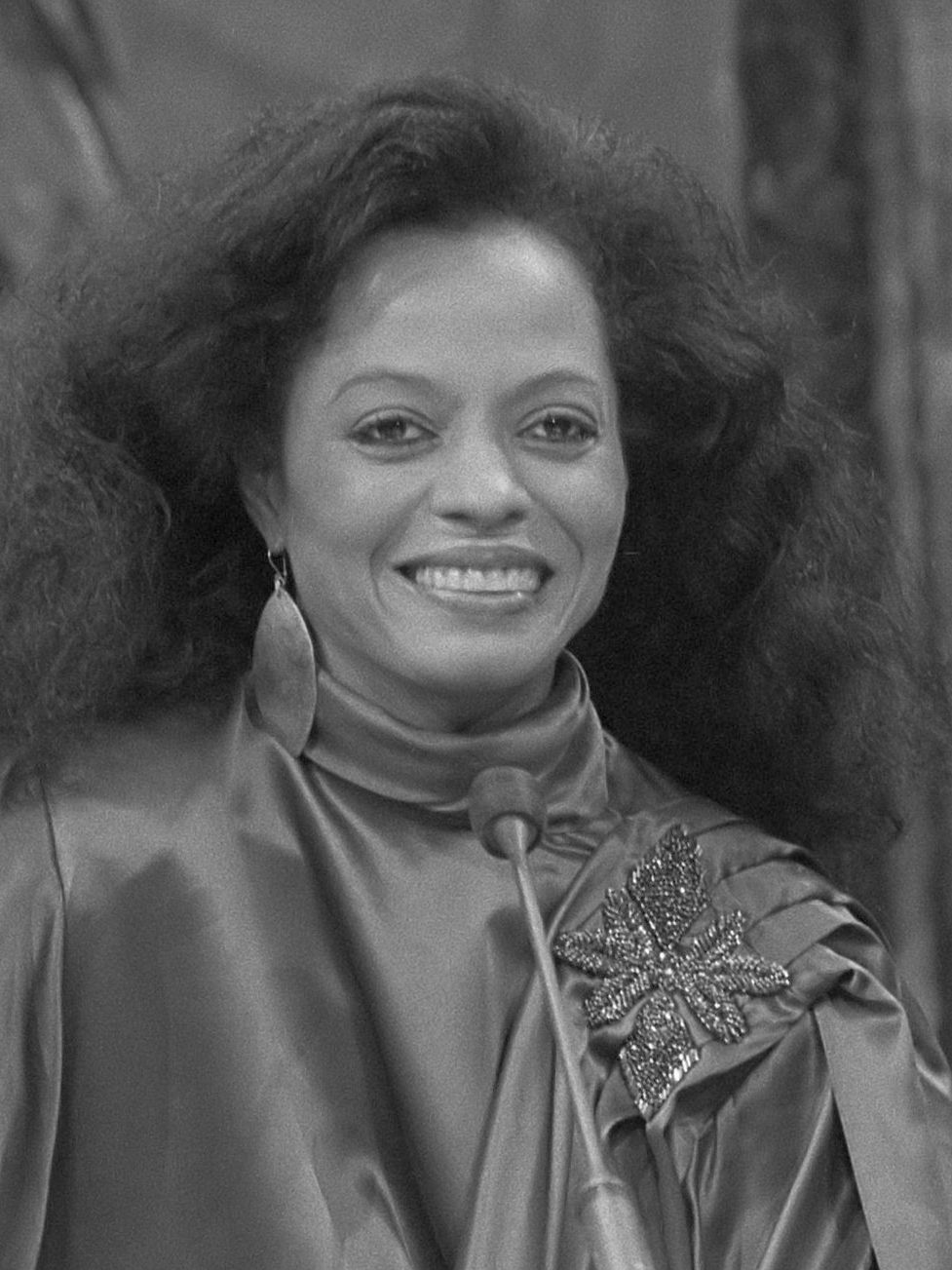
Ross in 1981

Ross began negotiations to leave Motown at the end of 1980. After over 20 years with the label, Ross received only US$250,000 as severance. RCA Records offered Ross a $20 million, seven-year recording contract, which gave her complete production control of her albums. Before signing onto the label, Ross allegedly asked Berry Gordy if he could match RCA's offer. Gordy stated that doing so was "impossible". Ross signed with RCA on May 18, 1981. At the time, the contract was music history's most expensive recording deal.

In October 1981, Ross released her first RCA album, Why Do Fools Fall in Love. The album sold over a million copies and featured hit singles such as her remake of the classic hit of the same name and "Mirror Mirror". Shortly thereafter, Ross established her production company, named Anaid Productions ("Diana" spelled backwards), and also began investing in real estate and touring extensively in the United States and abroad.

Before the release of Why Do Fools Fall in Love, Ross hosted her first TV special in four years, Diana. Directed by Steve Binder, the concert portions of the special were filmed at Inglewood, California's 17,500-seat The Forum indoor stadium and featured performances by Michael Jackson, Muhammad Ali, Dallas actor Larry Hagman, music impresario Quincy Jones and members of the Joffrey Ballet. In early 1982, Ross sang "The Star-Spangled Banner" at Super Bowl XVI and appeared on the musical variety show Soul Train. The episode, devoted completely to her, featured Ross performing several songs from Why Do Fools Fall in Love.

On May 6, 1982, Ross was honored with a star on the Hollywood Walk of Fame. She followed up the success of Why Do Fools Fall in Love with Silk Electric, which featured the Michael Jackson-written and -produced "Muscles", resulting in another Top 10 Grammy nominated success for Ross. The album eventually went gold on the strength of that song. In 1983, Ross ventured further out of her earlier soul-based sound for a more pop rock-oriented sound following the release of the Ross album. Though the album featured the Top 40 hit single, "Pieces of Ice", the Ross album did not generate any more hits or achieve gold status.

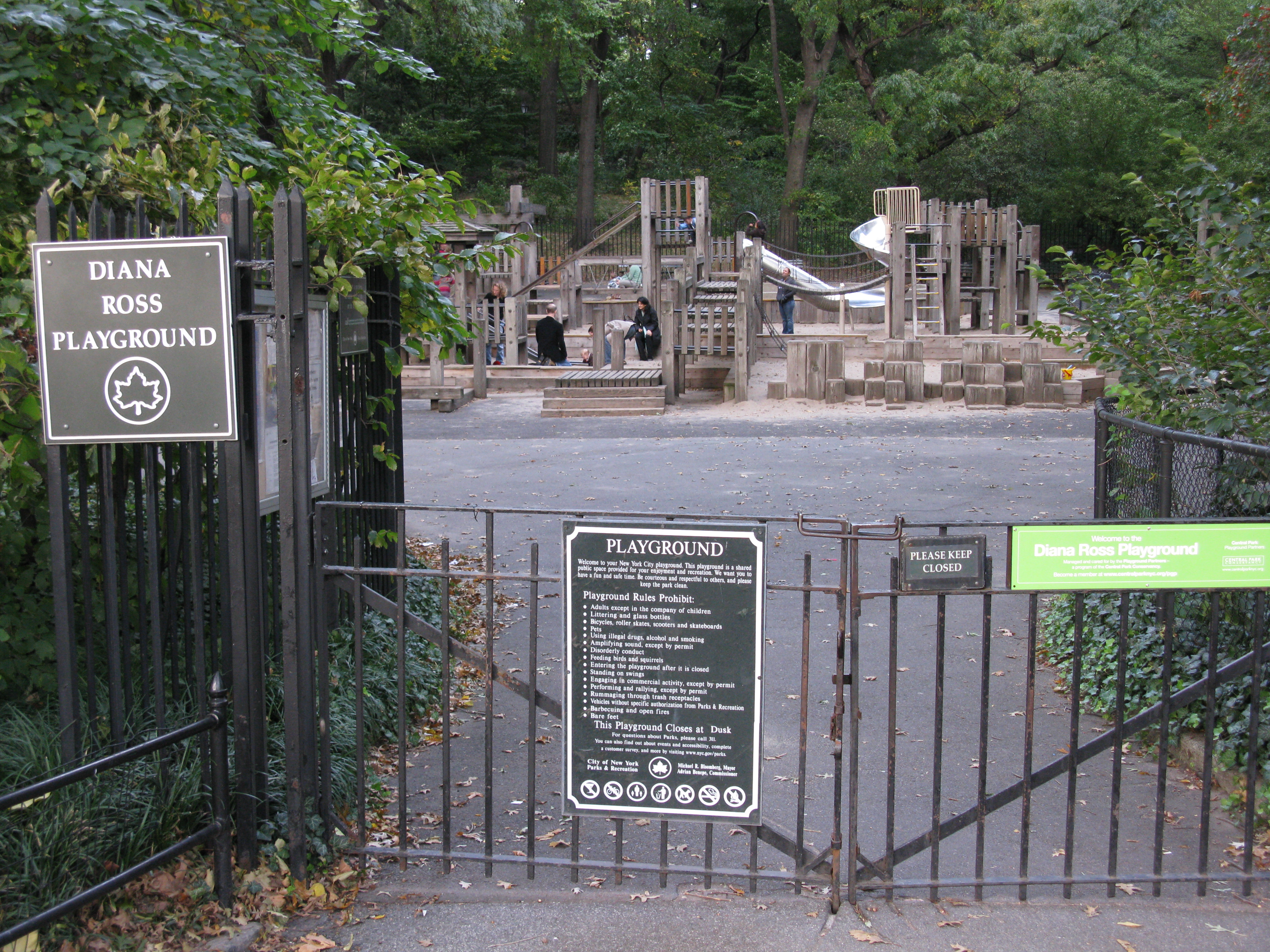
The Diana Ross Playground

On July 21, 1983, Ross performed a free concert on Central Park's Great Lawn, aired live worldwide by Showtime. Proceeds of the concert would be donated to build a playground in the singer's name. Midway through the beginning of the show, a torrential downpour began. Ross tried to continue performing, but the severe weather forced the show to be stopped after 45 minutes. Ross urged the large crowd to exit the venue safely, promising to perform the next day.

The next day's concert suffered no rain, but the memorabilia that was supposed to be sold to raise money for the playground had already been destroyed by the storm. When journalists discovered the exorbitant costs of the two concerts, Ross faced criticism from Mayor Ed Koch and the Parks Department commissioner. During a subsequent mayoral press conference, Ross handed Koch a check for US$250,000 for the project. The Diana Ross Playground was built three years later.

In 1984, Ross released Swept Away. The album featured "All of You", a duet with friend Julio Iglesias. The single was featured on both Ross's album and Iglesias's 1100 Bel Air Place, his first English-language album. It became an international hit, as did the Lionel Richie-penned ballad "Missing You", composed as a tribute to Marvin Gaye, who had been killed earlier that year. Swept Away garnered gold record sales status.

Her 1985 album Eaten Alive, produced by Barry Gibb of the Bee Gees, garnered a number-one single overseas and a Top 20 spot on the album charts. The song "Chain Reaction" reached number one in the U.K., Australia, South Africa, Israel and Ireland, and the title track, a collaboration with Michael Jackson and Gibb, also performed well. Both songs had strong music videos that propelled the tracks to success. The "Eaten Alive" video was patterned after the 1970s horror film The Island of Dr. Moreau, while the one for "Chain Reaction" saluted the 1960s American Bandstand-style TV shows. The video for "Experience", the third single from the album, reignited the "Eaten Alive" romantic storyline with Ross and actor Joseph Gian.

Earlier in 1985, Ross appeared as part of USA for Africa's "We Are the World" charity single, which sold over 20 million copies worldwide. Ross's 1987 follow-up to Eaten Alive, Red Hot Rhythm & Blues found less success; it reached No. 39 on the Billboard Top R&B Albums chart and No. 12 in Sweden. However, the album's accompanying television special was nominated for three Emmy Awards and won two: Outstanding Costume Design for a Variety or Music Program (Ray Aghayan and Ret Turner) and Outstanding Lighting Direction (Electronic) for a Miniseries or a Special (Greg Brunton). On January 27, 1986, Ross hosted the 13th annual American Music Awards. Ross returned the next year to host the 14th annual telecast.

=== 1988–1999: Return to Motown ===
In 1988, Ross chose to not renew her RCA contract and had been in talks with her former mentor Berry Gordy to return to Motown. When she learned of Gordy's plans to sell Motown, Ross tried advising him against the decision, though he ended up selling it to MCA Records in June of that year. Following the sale of the company, Ross was asked to return to the Motown label with the condition that she have shares in the company as a part-owner; Ross accepted the offer.

That same year, Ross was inducted into the Rock and Roll Hall of Fame as a member of the Supremes alongside her former singing partners Mary Wilson and Florence Ballard. She also recorded the theme song to animated adventure drama film The Land Before Time (1988). "If We Hold on Together" became an international hit, reaching number one in Japan.

Ross's next album, 1989's Workin' Overtime, was not a commercial success, despite the title track reaching the top three of the Billboard's Hot Black Singles chart. The album peaked at No. 34 on the Billboard Hot R&B Albums chart, and achieved top 25 chart placings in Japan and the UK. Subsequent releases, The Force Behind the Power (1991), Take Me Higher (1995), and Every Day Is a New Day (1999) all failed to achieve major success in America, selling around 100,000 copies each.

In 1991, Ross became one of the few American artists to have headlined the annual Royal Variety Performance, performing a selection of her UK hits before Queen Elizabeth II and Prince Philip, Duke of Edinburgh at the Victoria Palace Theatre, London. This marked her second appearance at the Royal Variety Performance, the first being in 1968 with the Supremes.

The Force Behind the Power sparked a comeback when the album went platinum in the UK. led by the No. 2 UK hit single "When You Tell Me That You Love Me". The album produced 9 singles across international territories, including another Top 10 UK hit "One Shining Moment". In 1993, Ross returned to acting with a dramatic role in the television film, Out of Darkness. Ross won acclaim for her role in the TV movie and earned her third Golden Globe nomination.

In 1994, One Woman: The Ultimate Collection, a career retrospective compilation, became a number one hit in the UK, selling quadruple platinum. The retrospective was EMI's alternative to Motown's box set Forever Diana: Musical Memoirs. Ross performed during the opening ceremony of the 1994 FIFA World Cup held in Chicago, and during the pre-match entertainment of the 1995 Rugby League World Cup final at Wembley Stadium.

On January 28, 1996, Ross performed at the Super Bowl XXX halftime show, held at the Sun Devil Stadium in Tempe, Arizona. Earlier that month, Ross's Tokyo concert, Diana Ross: Live in Japan, filmed live at the city's Nippon Budokan Stadium, was released. In May 1996, Ross received the World Music Awards' Lifelong Contribution to the Music Industry Award. On November 29, EMI released the compilation album, Voice of Love, featuring the singles "In the Ones You Love", "You Are Not Alone" and "I Hear (The Voice of Love)". On February 8, 1997, EMI released the Japanese edition of Ross's album, A Gift of Love, featuring the single, "Promise Me You'll Try". In May, she performed with operatic tenors Plácido Domingo and José Carreras again at the Superconcert of the Century concert, held in Taipei, Taiwan. She later inducted the Jackson 5 into The Rock and Roll Hall of Fame on May 6.

On February 19, 1998, Ross hosted the Motown 40 telecast on ABC. In 1999, Ross was named the most successful female singer in the history of the United Kingdom charts, based upon a tally of her career hits. Madonna would soon succeed Ross as the most successful female artist in the UK. Later that year, Ross presented at the 1999 MTV Video Music Awards in September of the year and shocked the audience by touching rapper Lil' Kim's exposed breast and pasty-covered nipple, amazed at the young rapper's brashness. In 1999, she and Brandy Norwood co-starred in the television movie, Double Platinum, which was aired prior to the release of Ross's album, Every Day Is a New Day. From that album, Ross scored a Top 10 hit in the UK in November that year with "Not Over You Yet".

=== 2000–2003: Supremes reunion ===
Ross reunited with Mary Wilson first in 1976 to attend the funeral service of Florence Ballard, who had died in February of that year. In March 1983, Ross agreed to reunite with Wilson and Cindy Birdsong for the television special Motown 25: Yesterday, Today, Forever. The Supremes did not rehearse their performance for that evening, due to time constraints. A scheduled medley of hits was cancelled.

Instead of following producer Suzanne de Passe's instructions to recreate their choreography from their final Ed Sullivan Show appearance, Wilson (according to her autobiography) planned with Birdsong to take a step forward every time Ross did the same, then began to sing lead on the group's final number-one hit song, "Someday We'll Be Together", on which Wilson did not perform.

Later, Wilson introduced Berry Gordy from the stage (unaware that the program's script called for Ross to introduce Gordy), at which point Ross subtly pushed down Wilson's hand-held microphone, stating, "It's been taken care of." Ross then re-introduced Gordy. These moments were excised from the final edit of the taped special, but still made their way into the news media; People magazine reported that "Ross [did] some elbowing to get Wilson out of the spotlight."

In 1999, Ross and mega-tour promoter SFX Entertainment (which later became Live Nation) began negotiations regarding a Diana Ross tour which would include a Supremes segment. During negotiations with Ross, the promoters considered the creation of a Supremes tour, instead. Ross agreed. As the tour's co-producer, Ross invited all living former Supremes to participate. Neither Jean Terrell nor late 1970s member Susaye Greene chose to participate. 70s Supremes Lynda Laurence and Scherrie Payne were then touring as Former Ladies of the Supremes.

Ross contacted Mary Wilson and Cindy Birdsong, who then began negotiations with SFX. Negotiations with Wilson and Birdsong (who allowed Wilson to negotiate on her behalf) failed when Wilson refused SFX's and Ross's offer of $4 million for 30 performances. Following the passage of SFX's final deadline for Wilson to accept their offer, Payne and Laurence, already negotiating with SFX, signed on to perform with Ross on the tour.

Laurence and Payne would later say that they got along well with Ross. The newly formed group performed together on Today and The Oprah Winfrey Show, as well as VH1's VH1 Divas 2000: A Tribute to Diana Ross. The Return to Love Tour launched in June 2000, to a capacity audience in Philadelphia. The tour's final performance was at New York City's Madison Square Garden. The tour was cancelled by SFX shortly thereafter, due to mediocre ticket sales, despite glowing reviews from media as varied as Billboard magazine, the Detroit Free Press, the Los Angeles Times and The Village Voice newspapers.

On December 5, 2000, Ross received a Heroes Award from the National Academy of Recording Arts & Sciences (NARAS). The Heroes Award is the highest distinction bestowed by the New York Chapter. Ross's first public post-RTL appearance was at a fundraiser for former president Bill Clinton. In January 2001, Love & Life: The Very Best of Diana Ross was released in the United Kingdom, becoming Ross's 17th gold album in that country. In June, Ross presented costume designer Bob Mackie with the Lifetime Achievement Award at the American Fashion Awards.

Two days before the September 11 attacks, Ross performed "God Bless America" at the US Open before the tournament's women's final, between Venus and Serena Williams. Immediately following the attacks, Ross performed the song again at Shea Stadium, before the New York Mets first game, after driving cross-country to be with her children (in the wake of the attacks, flying in the U.S. was temporarily restricted.). Ross teamed with legendary singers Patti LaBelle and Eartha Kitt, among others, for a Nile Rodgers-produced recording of Sister Sledge's classic disco hit, "We Are Family", recorded to benefit the families of 9/11 victims.

U.S. ticket sales for the new tour were brisk, from coast to coast. Venues, such as Long Island's Westbury Music Fair, California's Cerritos Center for the Performing Arts and Humphrey's Concerts by the Bay, attempted to add extra shows, due to public demand. Sold-out performances in Boston followed. In August, shortly after the tour began, however, Ross re-entered the Promises Institute's substance abuse rehabilitation program. That December, during her stay at Arizona's Canyon Ranch Health Resort, Ross was pulled over by Tucson police for driving the wrong way on a one-way street. She failed a breathalizer test and was arrested for a DUI. Ross was sentenced in 2004 to 48 hours in jail, which she served near her home in Greenwich, Connecticut.

In January 2003, Ross was honored as Humanitarian of the Year by Nile Rodgers's We Are Family Foundation. Shortly thereafter, Ross was feted as an honored guest at the National Association of Black-Owned Broadcasters Awards. Later that year, Ross was the guest performer at that year's Metropolitan Museum of Art's Costume Institute's annual gala, in an ensemble custom-designed by fashion designer Tom Ford, followed by an appearance as the surprise celebrity model for American couturier Dennis Basso's runway show. In February 2003, the Supremes were honored by the Rhythm and Blues Foundation with its Pioneer Award.

=== 2004–2019: I Love You and subsequent projects ===
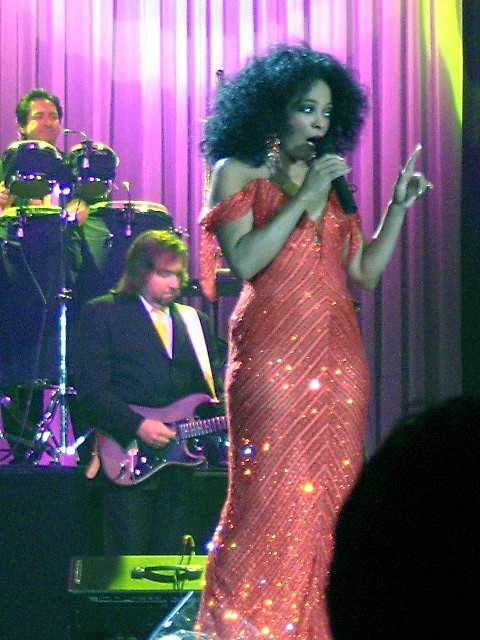
Ross performing at Rotterdam, Netherlands, 2007

In December 2004, Ross returned to television for the first time since 2002 when she performed for former Motown label mate Stevie Wonder during his Billboard Music Awards Century Award tribute. Ross participated at the Tsunami Aid: A Concert of Hope TV concert to help raise money for the tsunami victims of the 2004 Indian Ocean earthquake the following January.

Ross launched her M.A.C. Icon makeup collection, as part of the beauty corporation's Icon Series that same month. Ross was honored that year by Oprah Winfrey as one of 25 black American women in art, entertainment and civil rights to be honored at her "Legends Ball", which later aired in May 2006 on ABC.

Ross returned to the record charts that year after recording duets with Rod Stewart and Westlife. With the former, she recorded the Gershwin standard, "I've Got a Crush on You", which reached number 19 on the Billboard Adult Contemporary Songs chart, her first Billboard chart entry since 2000. With the latter, she re-recorded her 1991 hit, "When You Tell Me That You Love Me", which re-peaked at number two on the UK Singles Chart and number one in Ireland. It remains her latest hit in both countries.

In March 2006, Ross received the TV Land Awards' Viewer's Choice for Television's Greatest Music Moment for her For One & For All 1983 Central Park concerts.

In June 2006, Universal released Ross's shelved 1972 Blue album. It peaked at No. 2 on Billboard's Top Jazz Albums chart. That year, having signed with EMI/Manhattan Records, Ross released the album, I Love You, her first studio album since Every Day Is A New Day seven years earlier, where it reached number 32 on the Billboard 200 and number 16 on the Top R&B/Hip-Hop Albums chart. Ross promoted the album with a world tour throughout that year.

In June 2007, Ross received the Lifetime Achievement Award at the BET Awards. Later that December, she received the Kennedy Center Honors medal. In August 2008, Ross performed at the opening of the US Open tennis tournament, as part of a tribute to Billie Jean King. Later in October that year, she headlined the 2008 Nobel Peace Prize Concert in Oslo, Norway. Ross was the featured performer at the annual Symphonica in Rosso concert series, held at the GelreDome Stadium in Arnhem, Netherlands in October 2009.

In 2010, Ross embarked on her first headlining tour in three years titled the More Today Than Yesterday: The Greatest Hits Tour. Dedicated to the memory of her late friend Michael Jackson, the concert tour garnered positive reviews nationwide. In 2011, Ross was inducted into the Michigan Rock and Roll Legends Hall of Fame.

In February 2012, Ross received her first Grammy Award, for Lifetime Achievement, and announced the nominees for the Album of the Year. In May, a DVD of her Central Park concert performances, For One & For All, was released. She performed as the marquee and headlining performer at the White House-hosted Christmas in Washington concert on December 9, where she performed before former President Barack Obama, which was broadcast as an annual special on TNT.

On July 3, 2014, Ross was awarded the Ella Fitzgerald Award for "her extraordinary contribution to contemporary jazz vocals", at the Montreal International Jazz Festival.

On April 1, 2015, Ross began the first of nine performances as a part of her mini-residency, The Essential Diana Ross: Some Memories Never Fade at The Venetian in Las Vegas, Nevada. On November 22, 2016, Ross was awarded the Presidential Medal of Freedom by President Obama. That December, Billboard named her the 50th most successful dance club artist of all time.

On June 30, 2017, Ross headlined the Essence Festival in New Orleans, Louisiana, with her daughter Rhonda Ross-Kendrick performing as the opening act. Ross received the American Music Awards Lifetime Achievement Award in November 2017.

In December 2017, Ross appeared on the Home Shopping Network to promote her first fragrance, Diamond Diana. Ross released a CD retrospective collection of her music titled Diamond Diana that was released as a tie-in with the fragrance, which sold out within hours. In January 2018, Diamond Diana returned Ross to the Billboard 200, peaking at number 30 and stayed for a week and remains her latest album to chart there. The album also peaked at number six on the publication's R&B Albums chart and No. 5 on its Top Album Sales chart. The album featured the song "Ain't No Mountain High Enough 2017", remixed by Eric Kupper. The remix returned Ross to number one on the Billboard Dance Club Songs chart.

In February 2018, Ross began a new mini-residency at Wynn Las Vegas. That same year in August, a two-song remix of her 1980 hits "I'm Coming Out" and "Upside Down", also by Eric Kupper, titled "I'm Coming Out/Upside Down 2018" topped the Dance Club Songs chart. As a result of her successes on the dance chart that year, Ross ranked third place among the top dance club artists of the year on Billboard. In November 2018, she participated in the Macy's Thanksgiving Day Parade on November 22, 2018.

In February 2019, Ross returned to the Grammy Awards where she performed at the venue for the first time ever at the 61st annual telecast. She performed two songs—her 1993 ballad "The Best Years of My Life" and her 1970 hit "Reach Out and Touch (Somebody's Hand)". That April, she returned to number one on the Billboard Dance Club Songs chart with another Eric Kupper remix of her 1979 hit "The Boss" titled "The Boss 2019".

=== 2020–present: Thank You and Glastonbury ===
In May 2020, Ross released Supertonic: Mixes, a collection of nine of her greatest hits remixed by Eric Kupper and featuring her four consecutive number one hits on Billboard Dance Club Songs chart: "Ain't No Mountain High Enough 2017", "I'm Coming Out/Upside Down 2018", "The Boss 2019", and "Love Hangover 2020". In July, "Supertonic: Mixes" was also released on CD and crystal-clear vinyl LP.

Ross released her twenty-fifth studio album Thank You in November 2021. It was written and recorded during the COVID-19 pandemic lockdown and contains her first original material since 1999's Every Day Is a New Day. The album returned Ross to the UK albums chart where it debuted and peaked at number seven, producing her best chart performance there since Take Me Higher peaked at number ten in 1995.

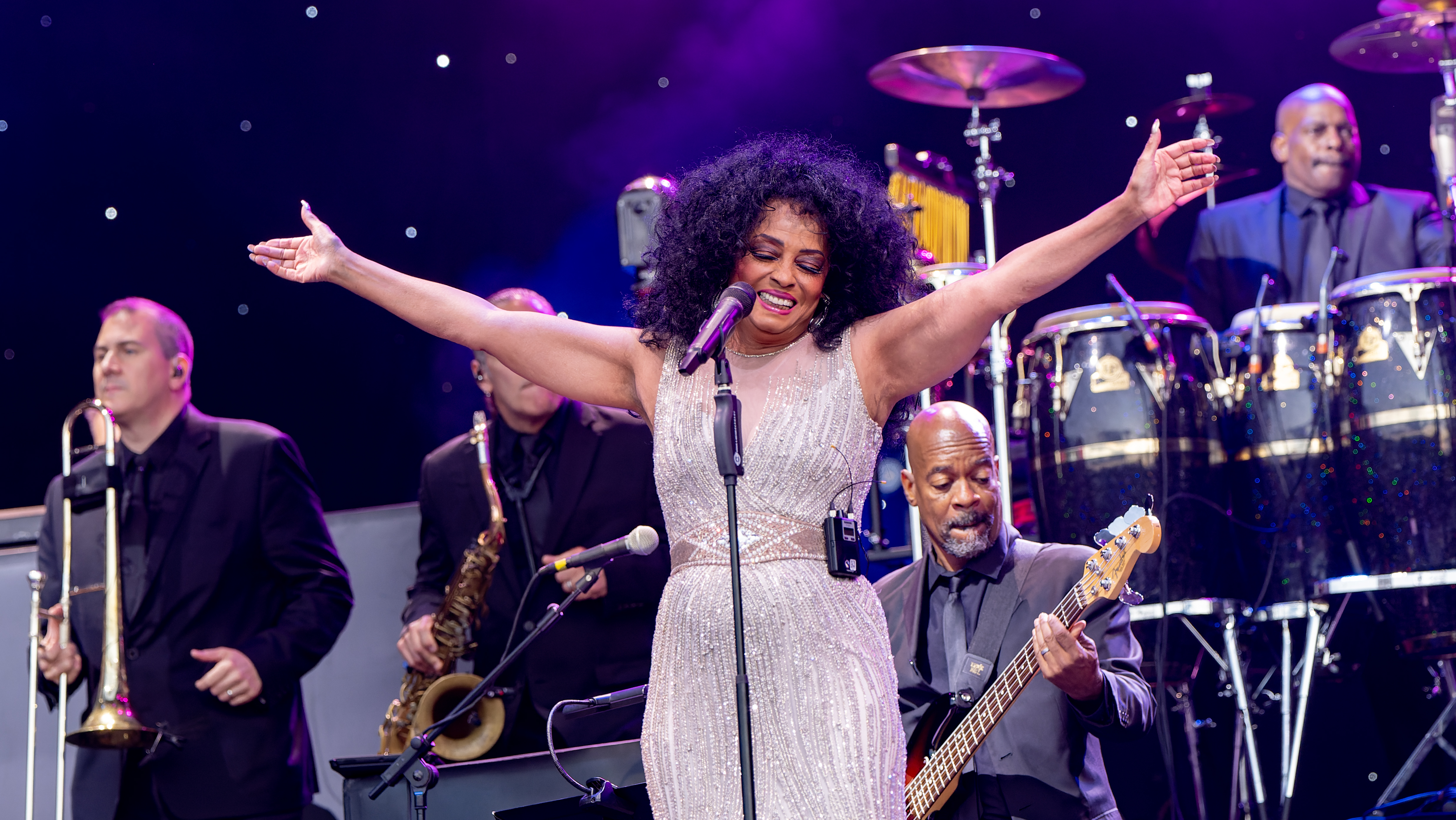
Ross performing live at Longleat in Wiltshire, England, 2022

In May 2022, she released the single "Turn Up the Sunshine", a collaboration with psychedelic pop band Tame Impala. The track is the lead single from the Jack Antonoff-produced original soundtrack album of the film Minions: The Rise of Gru. With the exception of this track, the album primarily features new spins on classic 1970s hits by artists such as Brittany Howard, St. Vincent, H.E.R., and many others.

On June 4, 2022, Ross appeared as the finale act at the Platinum Party at the Palace in celebration of the Platinum Jubilee of Elizabeth II. On June 10, Ross kicked off the UK leg of her Thank You Tour at Cardiff Castle. On June 26, Ross appeared live on the Pyramid Stage at the Glastonbury Festival.

Thank You received a Grammy Award nomination in the Best Traditional Pop Vocal Album category, her first competitive Grammy nomination since "Muscles" was nominated for Best Female R&B Vocal Performance in 1983.

In 2023, Ross returned to London's Royal Albert Hall for performances on October 14 and 15, and again in April 2024. Ross was among the musicians to participate in an Eminem-produced concert celebrating the grand reopening of the Michigan Central Station on June 6. The event was streamed live on Peacock. Additionally, a one-hour primetime re-broadcast was shown on NBC on June 9 at 7:00 p.m.

On May 5, 2025, Ross appeared at the 2025 Met Gala. Ross announced during her appearance that she was on tour and that her son, Evan had persuaded her to attend. Ross made headlines around the world for her appearance and 18 foot train which was specially designed to include the embroidered names of her children and grandchildren. Earlier in the year, Ross appeared at the 67th Grammy Awards and the 2025 BRIT Awards.

On December 31, 2025, Ross performed on the Dick Clark's New Year's Rockin' Eve show, and sang a collection of her greatest hits.

In May 2026, Ross began her first tour of Japan in 11 years and invited Japanese rock star and composer Yoshiki to perform a duet of "If We Hold On Together".

== Personal life ==
=== Relationships and family ===
Ross has been married twice and has five children. Ross became romantically involved with Motown CEO Berry Gordy in 1965. The relationship lasted several years, resulting in the birth of Ross's eldest child, Rhonda Suzanne Silberstein, in August 1971. Two months into her pregnancy with Rhonda, in January 1971, Ross married music executive Robert Ellis Silberstein, who raised Rhonda as his own daughter, despite knowing her true paternity. Ross told Rhonda that Gordy was her biological father when Rhonda was 13 years old. Beforehand, Rhonda referred to Gordy as "Uncle B.B."

Ross has two daughters with Silberstein, one of whom is Tracee Joy Silberstein (Tracee Ellis Ross), born in 1972. Ross and Silberstein divorced in 1977. In 2023, Smokey Robinson said in an interview that he and Ross had an affair lasting approximately one year while Robinson was married to his first wife, Claudette. According to Robinson, Ross ended the affair as Robinson admitted to still being in love with Claudette, a friend of Ross's. When asked about Robinson's story, Ross's representative had no comment.

Ross dated Gene Simmons, bassist and co-lead singer for the band Kiss, from 1980 to 1983.

Ross met her second husband, Norwegian shipping magnate Arne Næss Jr., in 1985, and married him the following year. She became stepmother to his three elder children, including folk singer Leona Naess. They have two sons together, including Evan Olav (born 1988). Ross and Næss divorced in 2000, after press reports revealed that Næss had fathered a child with another woman in Norway. Ross considers Næss the love of her life. Næss fell to his death in a South African mountain climbing accident in 2004. Ross remains close with her three ex-stepchildren.

Ross has seven grandchildren.

=== Religious views ===
Ross was raised in the Baptist church. According to her 1993 autobiography, Secrets of a Sparrow, her initial performances were in the Bessemer Baptist Church of Bessemer, Alabama, led by her maternal grandfather, Pastor William Moten, who (with his wife) raised her and her siblings there during their mother's bouts with tuberculosis.

=== 2002 arrest ===
Ross was arrested for DUI on December 30, 2002, in Tucson, Arizona, while undergoing substance abuse treatment at a local rehabilitation facility. She later served a two-day sentence near her Connecticut estate.

== Legacy ==
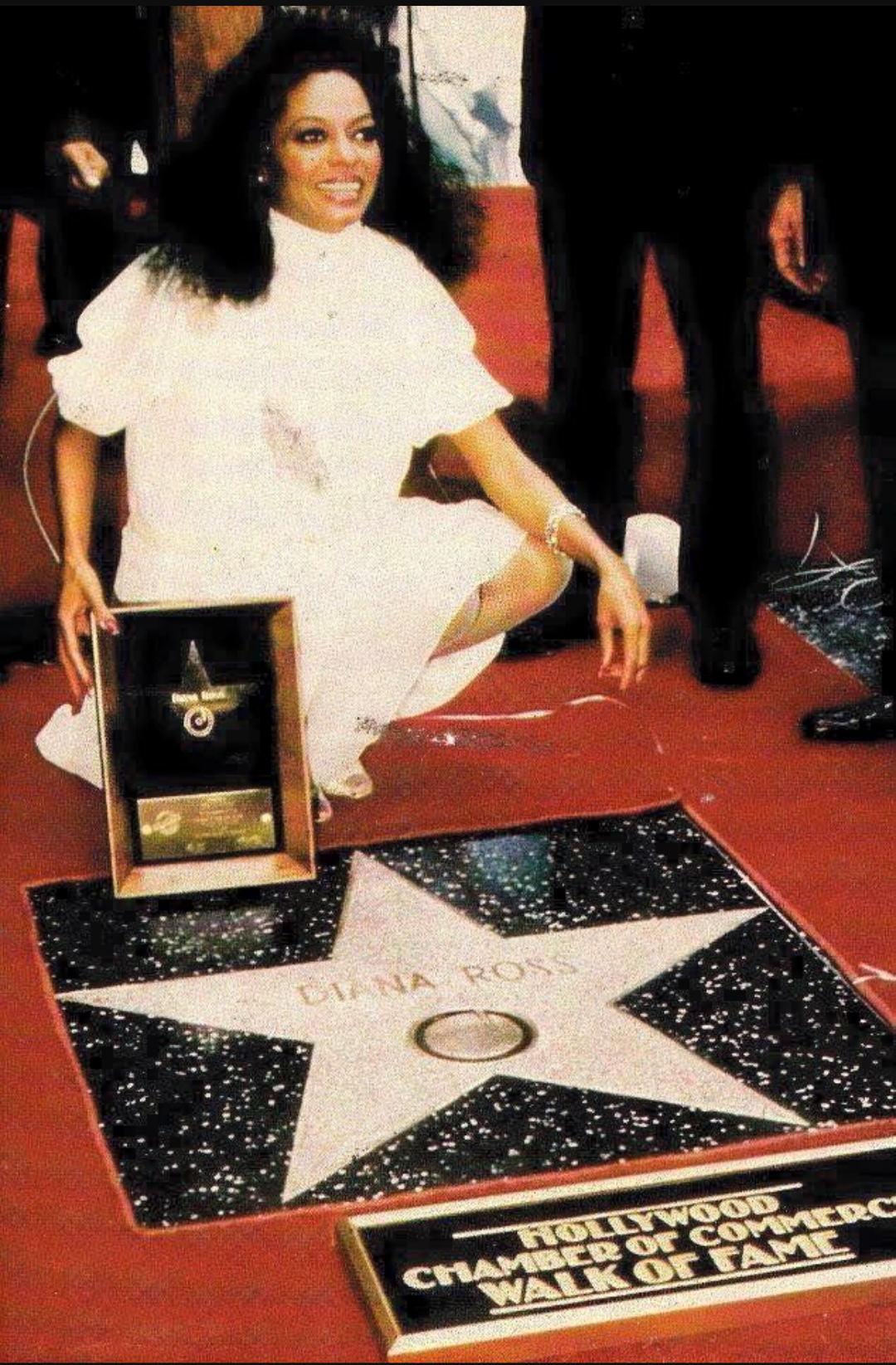
In 1982, Diana Ross received her first star on the Hollywood Walk of Fame. Apart from this star, Ross also received a second for her work with the Supremes.

Ross has influenced many artists including Michael Jackson, Beyoncé, Madonna, Jade Thirlwall, Questlove, Olivia Dean, Melanie Chisholm, Ledisi Lisa Stansfield and the Ting Tings. Several of Ross's songs have also been covered and sampled. "Ain't No Mountain High Enough" has been featured in the film Chicken Little. The song has also been covered live and on albums by Jennifer Lopez and Amy Winehouse. Janet Jackson sampled "Love Hangover" on her 1997 song "My Need" (featured on the album The Velvet Rope), having already sampled "Love Child" and "Someday We'll Be Together" by Ross & the Supremes on her 1993 tracks "You Want This" and "If" (both released as singles from the Janet album). "Love Hangover" was also sampled in Monica's 1998 hit single "The First Night" as well as being sampled by Will Smith, Master P (who also sampled "Missing You"), Heavy D and Bone Thugs-n-Harmony, "It's Your Move" was sampled in 2011 by Vektroid for her song "Lisa Frank 420 / Modern Computing", which appeared in her ninth album Floral Shoppe under her alias Macintosh Plus. "It's My House" was sampled by Lady Gaga for her song "Replay" which appeared on the 2020 album Chromatica. According to the sampling music database site, WhoSampled, Ross has seen her music sampled over 797 times and covered over 422 times; sans her music in the latter half of her Supremes tenure, Ross's solo work has been sampled 720 times and covered over 351 times.

Various works have been inspired by Ross's career and life. The character of Deena Jones in both the play and film versions of Dreamgirls was inspired by Ross. Motown: The Musical is a Broadway musical that launched on April 14, 2013. It is the story of Berry Gordy's creation of Motown Records and his romance with Diana Ross. She was portrayed by Valisia LeKae in 2013 and Lucy St. Louis in 2016. Ross was also portrayed by Candice Marie Woods (from 2017 to 2019) and Deri'Andra Tucker (2021) in the stage play Ain't Too Proud. There have been many other portrayals of Ross in films, television and other media including Holly Robinson Peete in The Jacksons: An American Dream (1992), Bianca Lawson in The Temptations TV mini-series (1998) and Michelle Williams in American Soul (2019).

As a member of the Supremes, her songs "Stop! In the Name of Love" and "You Can't Hurry Love" are among the Rock and Roll Hall of Fame's 500 Songs that Shaped Rock and Roll. They were inducted into the Rock and Roll Hall of Fame in 1988, received a star on the Hollywood Walk of Fame in 1994, and entered into the Vocal Group Hall of Fame in 1998. In 2004, Rolling Stone placed the group at number 96 on their list of the "100 Greatest Artists of All Time".

Ross has sold over 100 million records worldwide as a solo artist, making her one of the best-selling music artists of all time. As lead singer of the Supremes and as a solo artist, Ross has earned 18 number-one singles (12 as lead singer of the Supremes and 6 as a solo artist). The Supremes remain the best-charting female group in history. Ross is the only female artist to have number-one singles as a solo artist; as the other half of a duet (Lionel Richie); as a member of a trio (the Supremes); and, as an ensemble member ("We Are the World" by USA for Africa). Ross was featured on the Notorious B.I.G.'s 1997 number-one hit "Mo Money Mo Problems" since her voice from her 1980 hit "I'm Coming Out" was sampled for the song.

Billboard magazine named Ross the "female entertainer of the century" in 1976. Ross is also one of the few recording artists to have two stars on the Hollywood Walk of Fame—one as a solo artist and the other as a member of the Supremes. After her 1983 concert in Central Park, Diana Ross Playground was named in her honor with a groundbreaking opening ceremony in 1986.

Berry Gordy asked Ross to introduce The Jackson Five to the public. Eventually, public misunderstandings resulted in Ross erroneously being given credit for the discovery of the Jackson 5. Gordy decided that the misunderstanding was "good for business", so her "discovery" became a part of Motown's marketing and promotions plan for the Jackson 5. Consequently, their debut album was titled Diana Ross Presents The Jackson 5. Motown producer Bobby Taylor claims to have discovered the Jacksons, though, singer Gladys Knight also makes the claim. Even so, Ross embraced the role and became a good friend of Michael Jackson, serving as a mother figure to him.

On January 24, 1985, Kaufman Astoria Studios held a dedication ceremony in Astoria, Queens to honor Ross by naming Studio 4 at the studios after her. The Diana Ross Building served as an acknowledgement of Ross's contribution in bringing the studio back to the forefront after being faced with possible demolition, through her involvement in The Wiz. In 2006, Ross was one of 25 African-American women saluted at Oprah Winfrey's Legends Ball, a three-day celebration, honoring their contributions to art, entertainment, and civil rights. Ross has been described as one of the Five Mighty Pop Divas of the Sixties along with Dusty Springfield, Aretha Franklin, Martha Reeves, and Dionne Warwick. In 2023, Rolling Stone ranked Ross at number 87 on its list of the 200 Greatest Singers of All Time.

== Awards and nominations ==
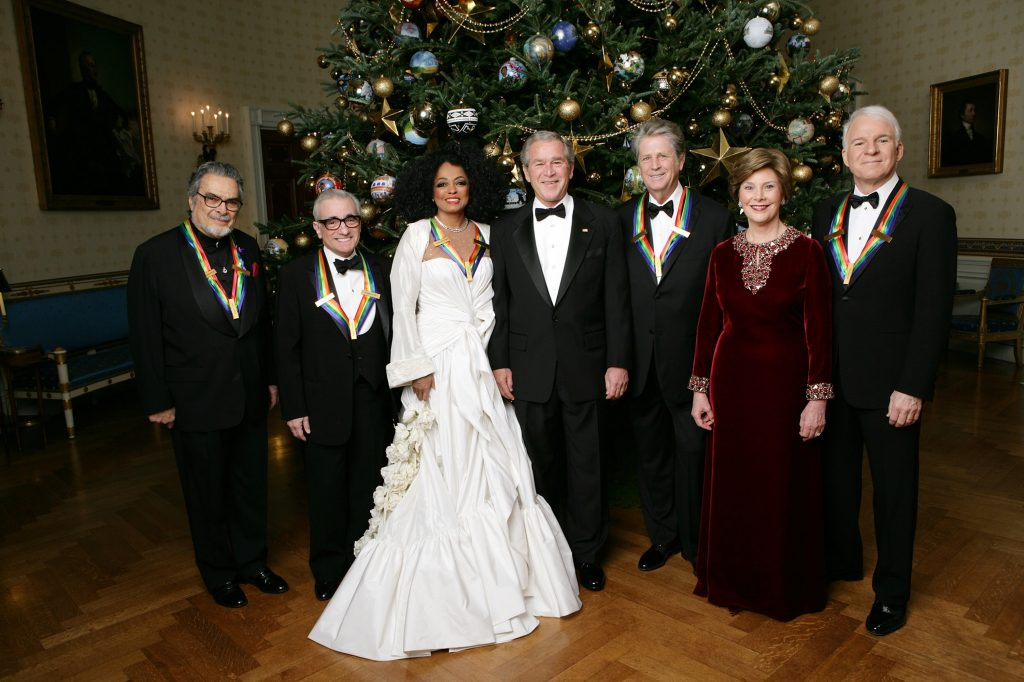
Ross stands besides Leon Fleisher, Martin Scorsese, George W. Bush, Brian Wilson, Laura Bush and Steve Martin at the Blue Room in the White House during the Kennedy Center Honors dinner in December 2007.

Between 1971 and 2022, Ross was nominated for thirteen Grammy Awards but never won one, becoming one of the biggest artists to never win a competitive Grammy.

In addition, Ross earned two additional nominations as member of the Supremes in 1965 and 1966. Her 1981 duet with Lionel Richie, "Endless Love", was her only Grammy nomination for Record of the Year.

In 2012, Ross finally received her first Grammy for lifetime achievement. Eleven years later, in 2023, Ross became the first woman to receive the Grammy Lifetime Achievement Award as both a solo artist and as member of a group after she and fellow Supremes co-founders, the late Mary Wilson and Florence Ballard, received the Lifetime Achievement Award.

Ross is also the recipient of seven American Music Awards from 1974 until 1983. In 2017, she was awarded the Lifetime Achievement Award from the organization and gave her first AMA performance since 1986.

While attending the Rock Music Awards in 1976, Ross received the special honor for "Female Entertainer of the Century", becoming her first lifetime honor at the age of 32. In 1982, she received a star on the Hollywood Walk of Fame. Twelve years later, in 1994, Ross's former group the Supremes also received a star in the same walk of Fame.

In 1988, Ross was inducted alongside fellow Supremes founding members Mary Wilson and Florence Ballard, into the Rock and Roll Hall of Fame.

In 1993, the Guinness World Records cited Ross as the most successful female charting artist in the UK.

In December 2007, Ross received a medal from the Kennedy Center Honors in Washington, D.C.

On November 16, 2016, Ross was announced as one of the 21 recipients of the Presidential Medal of Freedom, the nation's highest civilian honor.

== Discography ==
Studio albums

- Diana Ross (1970)
- Everything Is Everything (1970)
- Surrender (1971)
- Touch Me in the Morning (1973)
- Diana & Marvin (with Marvin Gaye) (1973)
- Last Time I Saw Him (1973)
- Diana Ross (1976)
- Baby It's Me (1977)
- Ross (1978)
- The Boss (1979)
- Diana (1980)
- To Love Again (1981)
- Why Do Fools Fall in Love (1981)
- Silk Electric (1982)
- Ross (1983)
- Swept Away (1984)
- Eaten Alive (1985)
- Red Hot Rhythm & Blues (1987)
- Workin' Overtime (1989)
- The Force Behind the Power (1991)
- A Very Special Season (1994)
- Take Me Higher (1995)
- Every Day Is a New Day (1999)
- Blue (2006)
- I Love You (2006)
- Diana Ross Sings Songs from The Wiz (2015)
- Thank You (2021)

== Filmography ==
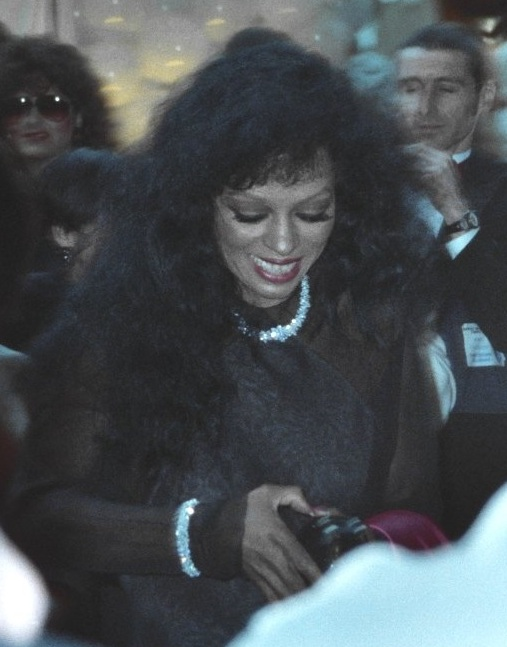
Diana Ross at the Academy Awards in 1990

Year	Title	Role	Notes
1972	Lady Sings the Blues	Billie Holiday	Nominated—Academy Award for Best Actress; Nominated—BAFTA Award for Best Actress in a Leading Role; Nominated—Golden Globe Award for Best Actress in a Motion Picture – Drama; Won—Golden Globe Award for New Star of the Year – Actress; Won—NAACP Image Award for Outstanding Actress in a Motion Picture
1975	Mahogany	Tracy Chambers	
1978	The Wiz	Dorothy Gale	Nominated—Saturn Award for Best Actress
1994	Out of Darkness	Paulie Cooper	Nominated—Golden Globe Award for Best Actress – Miniseries or Television Film
1999	Double Platinum	Olivia King	
2019	Diana Ross: Her Life, Love & Legacy	Herself	Documentary and concert film
2023	Renaissance: A Film by Beyoncé	Herself	Documentary and concert film
2024	The Greatest Night in Pop	Herself	Documentary film

== Television ==
- The Ed Sullivan Show (with the Supremes) (multiple appearances 1964–1969)
- T.A.M.I. Show (with the Supremes) (1964)
- Ready, Steady, Go! (with the Supremes) (1965)
- The Mike Douglas Show (with the Supremes) (1965)
- The Tonight Show (with the Supremes) (1967)
- Tarzan (with the Supremes) (1968)
- TCB (with the Supremes and the Temptations) (1968)
- The Bing Crosby Special: Makin' Movies (with the Supremes) (1968)
- The Dinah Shore Special: Like Hep (with Dinah Shore and Lucille Ball) (1969)
- The Hollywood Palace (with the Supremes) (1969)
- G.I.T. on Broadway (with the Supremes and the Temptations) (1969)
- The Merv Griffin Show (1970)
- Diana! (1971)
- The Jackson 5ive (1971)
- Make Room for Granddaddy (1971)
- The Mike Douglas Show (1972)
- The Tonight Show (1973)
- Diana Ross at the Royal Albert Hall (BBC Show of the Week) (1973)
- The Tonight Show (1975)
- 48th Academy Awards (1976)
- Rock Music Awards (1976)
- The Tonight Show (1977)
- Here I Am: An Evening with Diana Ross (1977)
- Barbara Walters Special (1978)
- The Tonight Show (1979)
- Macy's Thanksgiving Day Parade (1979)
- The Muppet Show (1980)
- Bob Hope's All Star Comedy Birthday Party (1980)
- Standing Room Only (HBO) (1980)
- Diana (CBS TV Special) (1981)
- The Tonight Show (1981)
- 54th Academy Awards (1982)
- Super Bowl XVI (1982)
- Soul Train (1982)
- Sesame Street (1982)
- Motown 25: Yesterday, Today, Forever (1983)
- Diana Ross: Live in Central Park/For One and For All (Showtime) (1983)
- The Tonight Show (1983)
- The Jerry Lewis MDA Labor Day Telethon (1984)
- Lifestyles of the Rich and Famous (1984)
- 57th Academy Awards (1985)
- We Are the World: The Story Behind the Song (1985)
- Motown Returns to the Apollo (1985)
- An All-Star Celebration Honoring Martin Luther King Jr. (1986)
- American Music Awards of 1986 (1986)
- American Music Awards of 1987 (1987)
- Diana Ross: Red Hot Rhythm & Blues (1987)
- Barbara Walters Special (1989)
- Diana Ross: Workin' Overtime HBO: World Stage (1989)
- 62nd Academy Awards (1990)
- The Larry King Show (1991)
- The Arsenio Hall Show (1991)
- The Tonight Show (1991)
- Royal Variety Performance (1991)
- Muhammed Ali's 50th Birthday Celebration (1992)
- Diana Ross Live! The Lady Sings... Jazz & Blues: Stolen Moments (1992)
- Christmas in Vienna (1992)
- The Oprah Winfrey Show (1993)
- First inauguration of Bill Clinton (1993)
- The Charlie Rose Show (1993)
- Apollo Theatre Hall of Fame (1993)
- Regis & Kathie Lee (1993)
- BET Walk of Fame (1993)
- Always is Forever: 30th Anniversary (1993)
- Victoires de la musique (1994)
- 1994 FIFA World Cup (1994)
- Soul Train Music Awards (1995)
- 1995 Rugby World Cup (1995)
- Regis & Kathie Lee (1995)
- Video Soul (1995)
- The Tonight Show (1995)
- The Greatest Music Party in the World (1995)
- World Music Awards (1996)
- Super Bowl XXX halftime show (NBC) (1996)
- Late Show with David Letterman (1996)
- 1997 Brit Awards (1997)
- Super Concert of the Century (1997)
- Motown 40: The Music Is Forever (1998)
- Tonight at the London Palladium (1998)
- The Oprah Winfrey Show (1999)
- BET Doc U Groove (1999)
- The View (1999)
- An Audience with Diana Ross (1999)
- The Oprah Winfrey Show (2000)
- VH1 Divas 2000: A Tribute to Diana Ross (2000)
- The Today Show (2000)
- NAACP Image Awards (2000)
- The View (2000)
- 2001 US Open (2001)
- MLB: Pre-Game Ceremony at Shea Stadium (TBS) (2001)
- Barbara Walters Special (2002)
- Pride of Britain Awards (2004)
- The View (2004)
- Billboard Music Awards (2004)
- Tsunami Aid (2005)
- 2006 US Open (2006)
- Inside the Actors Studio (2007)
- TV Land Awards (2006)
- Oprah Winfrey's Legends Ball (2006)
- Good Morning America (2007)
- Late Night with David Letterman (2007)
- The Martha Stewart Show (2007)
- American Idol (2007)
- BET Awards 2007 (2007)
- Kennedy Center Honors (2007)
- Nobel Peace Prize Concert (2008)
- The Oprah Winfrey Show: Farewell and Salute (2011)
- 54th Annual Grammy Awards (2012)
- Christmas in Washington (2012)
- The Voice (2014)
- HSN (2017)
- American Music Awards 2017 (2017)
- Macy's Thanksgiving Day Parade (2018)
- 86th Annual Christmas in Rockefeller Centre (2018)
- NBC's New Year's Eve (2018)
- 61st Annual Grammy Awards (2019)
- Motown 60: A Grammy Celebration (2019)
- Platinum Party at the Palace (2022)
- Glastonbury Festival 2022 (2022)
- Diana Ross: Supreme Sensation (2023)
- Diana Ross at the BBC (2024)
- Live from Detroit: The Concert at Michigan Central (2024)
- 67th Annual Grammy Awards (2025)
- 2025 Brit Awards (2025)
- Dick Clark's New Year's Rockin' Eve 2026 (2025)

== Stage ==
- An Evening with Diana Ross (1976)

== Tours ==
Headlining

- The Diana Ross Show (1970–75)
- An Evening with Diana Ross (1975–78)
- Tour '79 (1979)
- Diana Ross on Tour (1980-1982)
- Up Front Tour (1983)
- Swept Away Tour (1984)
- Eaten Alive Tour (1985–86)
- Red Hot Rhythm & Blues Tour (1987-88) (cancelled due to pregnancy)
- Workin' Overtime World Tour (1989-90)
- Here And Now Tour (1991–92)
- Forever Diana: 30th Anniversary Tour (1993–95)
- Take Me Higher Tour (1995–96)
- Voice of Love Tour (1997–98)
- Always is Forever Tour (1999)
- Live Love Tour (2003)
- This is It Tour (2004)
- I Love You Tour (2006–08)
- More Today Than Yesterday: The Greatest Hits Tour (2010–11)
- In the Name of Love Tour (2013–17)
- Brand New Day Tour (2019)
- Music Box Tour (2019)
- Thank You Tour (previously named "Top of The World Tour") (2022)
- The Music Legacy Tour (2023)
- Beautiful Love Performances: Legacy 2024 (2024)
- Diana Ross: A Symphonic Celebration (2025)
- Diana in Motion (2026)

Co-headlining tours

- Superconcert of the Century (with Plácido Domingo and José Carreras) (1996-97; 1999)
- Return to Love Tour (with former members of the Supremes) (2000)

Residency shows

- Some Memories Never Fade (2015, 2017)
- All the Best (2016)
- Endless Memories (2017–18)
- Music and Love (2018)
- Diamond Diana (2019)
- An Extraordinary Evening (2020)

== Bibliography ==
- Ross, Diana (October 1993). Secrets of a Sparrow. Random House. ISBN 0-679-42874-7.
- Ross, Diana (March 1995). When You Dream.
- Ross, Diana (December 2002). Shelnutt, Rosanne (ed.). Diana Ross: Going Back. New York: Universe. ISBN 0-7893-0797-9. (A scrapbook-style collection of photographs)

== See also ==
- List of artists who reached number one in the United States
- List of artists who reached number one on the U.S. Dance Club Songs chart
- List of Billboard number-one singles
- List of Billboard number-one dance club songs
