= Diana Ross Playground =

Playground in Central Park, New York City

Coordinates: 40°46′56″N 73°58′16″W

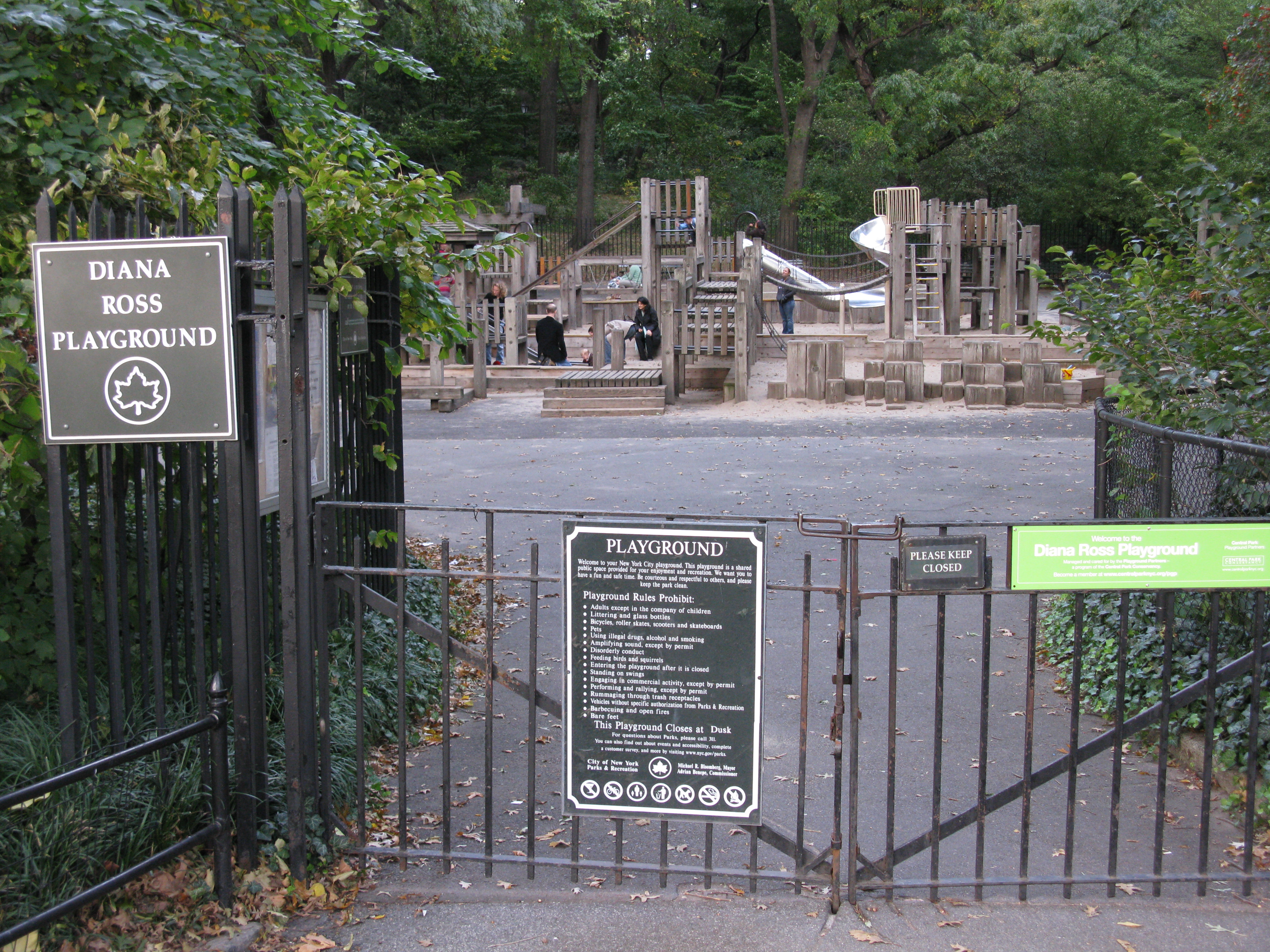
The entrance to the playground

Notable buildings and structures of Central Park. Click on the map and then on the points for details.

The Diana Ross Playground is located in New York City's Central Park, inside the park at West 81st Street and Central Park West.

== History ==
Diana Ross Playground was built in 1935–36 as one of the park's perimeter playgrounds. It opened as West 81st Street Playground.

In 1969, the playground was renovated. The playground equipment was replaced, and a new water feature designed by Richard Dattner was added. This water feature consisted of four octagonal concrete pillars, each of which sprayed water into similarly shaped wading pools. Two towers sprayed out a flat stream, while the other two poured out water like a waterfall.

The recording artist Diana Ross, who lived across the street in The Beresford, gave two free concerts in Central Park on July 21 and 22, 1983 (attendance estimated to be between 400,000 and 800,000 people), and pledged to rebuild West 81st Street playground in Central Park with proceeds from the television rights. However, when a thunderstorm during the first (and only scheduled) concert destroyed all of its memorabilia/merchandise, the performance did not prove profitable, and Ross used personal resources to fund the project.

Groundbreaking took place in September 1986, with both Ross and then-Mayor Ed Koch present. Ross reportedly called the event "one of the most fulfilling aspects of [her] life and career." The playground reopened in 1987 as Diana Ross Playground.

== Description ==
The playground is equipped with sturdy wood equipment, tire swings, a tube slide, a corkscrew slide, sandboxes, rope bridges, and a mushroom-style water feature. Open daily from 7:30am to dusk, the space is maintained by the Central Park Conservancy's Playground Partners program.

To the north of the playground, the ground rises in a steep slope to Summit Rock, the highest point in Central Park. To the east, secluded in shrub plantings, is Tanner's Spring, one of two natural springs that remain in the park (the other being Montayne's Spring at the Pool). Its name commemorates Dr. Henry S. Tanner, a proponent of therapeutic fasting, who, in the summer of 1880, elected to fast under constant observation for forty days and nights, supplied only by water from this spring. M.M. Graff, in relating the story, observed "The legend quite naturally arose that the water of the spring contained some magically concentrated nutrients". Before the construction of the park, the spring provided water for the community of Seneca Village, located to the north of Summit Hill, which at the time was called "Goat Hill".

In May 2012, after the Diana Ross: For One and For All DVD of the concert was released, DNAinfo called the playground one of the "best playgrounds on the Upper West Side".
