= Would I Love You (Love You, Love You) =

Song
- Published: 1950
- Genre: Pop
- Composer: Harold Spina
- Lyricist: Bob Russell

"Would I Love You (Love You, Love You)" is a pop song composed by Harold Spina with lyrics by Bob Russell. It was published in 1950 and covered by many different musicians.

== Hit recordings ==
The song was popularized by Patti Page in a recording made on January 2, 1951. The recording was issued by Mercury Records as catalog number 5571 and first reached the Billboard charts on February 10, 1951, where it lasted for 19 weeks and peaked at No. 4.

Another recording was made jointly by Doris Day and Harry James. It was issued by Columbia Records as catalog number 39159 with the flip side "Lullaby of Broadway." It reached the Billboard charts at No. 19 on March 2, 1951, where it lasted for 10 weeks.

A cover by Tony Martin also charted. This recording was released by RCA Victor Records as catalog number 20-4056. It first reached the Billboard charts on February 23, 1951, where it lasted for 4 weeks and peaked at No. 25.

The song was Helen O'Connell's first solo hit. Her recording for Capitol (No. 1368) with Dave Cavanaugh's orchestra reached the No. 16 spot on the Billboard charts during a 10-week stay in 1951.

In the UK, the song reached No. 8 on the sheet music charts, with British covers by Steve Conway, Dick James, Joe Loss and his orchestra, and Jimmy Young.

== Other notable recordings ==
- Abbey Lincoln - included in her album Abbey Lincoln's Affair... A Story of a Girl in Love (1957)
- Cesar Romero - in his album Songs by a Latin Lover (1958)
- Gogi Grant - included in her album Granted It's Gogi (1959)
- Mexican singer María Victoria recorded a Spanish-language version in 1951 with the title Mucho, mucho, mucho.
