= Abbey Lincoln's Affair =

Abbey Lincoln's Affair... A Story of a Girl in Love

Studio album by Abbey Lincoln
- Released: 1957
- Recorded: November 5–6, 1956
- Studio: Hollywood, California
- Genre: Jazz
- Label: Liberty; LRP 3025
- Producer: Russell Keith

Abbey Lincoln chronology
Abbey Lincoln's Affair... A Story of a Girl in Love (1957)	That's Him! (1957)

Abbey Lincoln's Affair... A Story of a Girl in Love is the debut album by jazz vocalist Abbey Lincoln. It was recorded on November 5 and 6, 1956, in Hollywood, California, and was released in 1957 by Liberty Records. On the album, which features jazz standards arranged by Benny Carter, Jack Montrose, and Marty Paich, Lincoln is accompanied by various groups of anonymous musicians. In 1993, the album was reissued by Capitol Records with six additional tracks recorded during July 1956.

The album cover depicts Lincoln sprawled on the floor, wearing a tight gown. Years later, she reflected: "That was the way they packaged women singers then, and I went along with it because I didn't know any better. I didn't yet think of myself as a serious artist—or as a serious person, either. All I wanted was to be thought of as beautiful and desirable."

== Reception ==
Professional ratings
Review scores
Source	Rating
AllMusic	3/5 stars
MusicHound Jazz	3/5 stars
The Rolling Stone Jazz & Blues Album Guide	3/5 stars
The Virgin Encyclopedia of Jazz	3/5 stars

In a review for AllMusic, Scott Yanow wrote: "At the time, Lincoln was making the transition from a potential sex symbol and lounge singer to a dramatic jazz interpreter... Lincoln's straightforward delivery was already impressive and pleasing."

A reviewer for Billboard described Lincoln as "a highly provocative singer," and called the album "an outstanding one from all views, selection of repertoire, music and Miss Lincoln's singing."

== Track listing ==
Chapter One

1. "Love Walked In" (George Gershwin, Ira Gershwin) – 2:32
2. "I Didn't Know About You" (Duke Ellington, Bob Russell) – 2:45
3. "Would I Love You" (Harold Spina, Bob Russell) – 2:21
4. "I Wake Up Smiling" (Edgar Leslie, Fred Ahlert) – 2:06
5. "This Can't Be Love" (Richard Rodgers, Lorenz Hart) – 2:22
6. "Crazy He Calls Me" (Carl Sigman, Bob Russell) – 2:55

Chapter Two

1. "Two Cigarettes in the Dark" (Lew Pollack, Paul Francis Webster) – 2:37
2. "The Masquerade is Over" (Allie Wrubel, Herb Magidson) – 2:59
3. "Take Me in Your Arms" (Fred Markush, Fritz Rotter, Mitchell Parish) – 3:06
4. "Together" (Ray Henderson, Buddy DeSylva, Lew Brown) – 1:53
5. "Affair" (Bob Russell) – 2:59
6. "No More" (Toots Camarata, Bob Russell) – 3:06

Tracks included on 1993 reissue

1. "Warm Valley" (Duke Ellington, Bob Russell) – 3:16
2. "You Do Something to Me" (Cole Porter) – 2:31
3. "Do Nothing till You Hear from Me" (Duke Ellington, Bob Russell) – 2:14
4. "The Answer is No" (Harold Levey) – 2:15
5. "Lonesome Cup of Coffee" (Bob Russell) – 2:38
6. "She Didn't Say Yes" (Jerome Kern, Otto Harbach) – 2:20

== Personnel ==
- Abbey Lincoln – vocals
