= Devil's Got Your Tongue =

1992 studio album by Abbey Lincoln

Studio album by Abbey Lincoln
- Released: October 13, 1992
- Recorded: February 24 and 25, 1992
- Studio: BMG Studios, New York City
- Genre: Jazz
- Length: 68:56
- Label: Verve
- Producer: Jean-Philippe Allard

Abbey Lincoln chronology
You Gotta Pay the Band (1991)	Devil's Got Your Tongue (1992)	Abbey Sings Billie, Volume 2 (1992)

Devil's Got Your Tongue is the fifteenth album by Abbey Lincoln, and her third for Verve Records. It was released on October 13, 1992. The album peaked at number two on the Billboard Jazz Albums chart on April 10, 1993.

== Critical reception ==
Professional ratings
Review scores
Source	Rating
AllMusic	4.5/5 stars
MusicHound Jazz	4.5/5 stars
The Penguin Guide to Jazz	3/4 stars
The Rolling Stone Jazz & Blues Album Guide	3/5 stars
The Virgin Encyclopedia of Jazz	3/5 stars

A reviewer for AllMusic stated: "Her interpretive skills and emotional commitment to the material are such that she can even take on a familiar standard like 'A Child Is Born' and make it her own. It's gratifying to see a major jazz label allowing Lincoln's musical vision to flourish and grow."

The authors of The Penguin Guide to Jazz Recordings wrote: "Vocally and musically, the material is too dense, almost as if she is trying to recapture the contours of the old Candid sessions, but not recognizing that modern recording and production will tend to swamp arrangements like this."

== Track listing ==
All tracks are written by Abbey Lincoln, unless otherwise noted

No.	Title	Writer(s)	Length
1.	"Rainbow" (with The Noel Singers)	Abbey Lincoln; Melba Liston	4:42
2.	"Evalina Coffrey (The Legend Of)"		7:04
3.	"Story of My Father" (with The Staple Singers)		5:28
4.	"A Child Is Born" (with The Noel Singers)	Thad Jones; Alex Wilder	6:20
5.	"People in Me" (with The Noel Singers)		6:13
6.	"A Circle of Love" (with The Noel Singers)		5:53
7.	"Jungle Queen"		6:09
8.	"The Merry Dancer"		7:48
9.	"Devil's Got Your Tongue"		5:49
10.	"Spring Will Be a Little Late This Year"	Frank Loesser	7:46
11.	"The Music Is the Magic" (with The Staple Singers)		5:44
Total length:			68:56

== Musicians ==
- Abbey Lincoln – vocals
- Rodney Kendrick – piano
- Marcus McLaurine – bass
- Grady Tate – drums (tracks 2–4, 10–11)
- Yoron Israel – drums (tracks 1, 5, 6, 8–9)
- James Louis "J.J." Johnson – trombone (tracks 2, 4, 10)
- Stanley Turrentine – tenor saxophone (tracks 5, 8, 10–11)
- Maxine Roach – viola (tracks 2, 6)
- Babatunde Olatunji – Ngoma, Djembe, Ashiko & Shekere drums (track 7)
- Kehinde O'Uhuru – Ashiko drum (track 7)
- Sule O'Uhuru – Agogô bells, Djembe (track 7)
- Gordy Ryan – Jun-jun drum (track 7)
- The Staple Singers – backing vocals
  - Pops Staples, Mavis Staples, Cleotha Staples
- The Noel Singers – backup singers
  - Ivan Archer, Giselle Brown, Queinton Caesar, Ronnie David, Shelby Ellis, Daylene Hunt, Clevie Jordan, Marie Leveque, Lucila Martinez, Jason Moses, Gregory Norman, Leigh-Ann Oadmore, Aleata Prince, Natasha Reeves, Tiffany Rivera, Linda Sanchez, Joann Santiago Sherrille Shabazz, Chante Slater, Karen Thompson, Teddy Turrene, Merlene West, Tasha Woodward

== Production ==
- Producer – Jean-Philippe Allard
- Engineer (First Engineer) – Rick Applegate
- Engineer (Second Engineer) – Jay Newland
- Engineer (Assistant Engineer) – Doug McKean
- Engineer (Assistant Engineer) – Sandy Palmer

Track information and credits adapted from the album's liner notes.

== Charts ==
Chart (1993)	Peak position
Traditional Jazz (Billboard)	2
