= Sophisticated Abbey: Live at the Keystone Korner =

Live album by Abbey Lincoln
- Released: 2015
- Recorded: March 1980
- Venue: Keystone Korner, San Francisco, California
- Genre: Jazz
- Length: 54:01
- Label: HighNote; HCD7280
- Producer: David Jaye

Abbey Lincoln chronology
Abbey Sings Abbey (2007)	Sophisticated Abbey: Live at the Keystone Korner (2015)	Love Having You Around: Live at the Keystone Korner Vol. 2 (2016)

Sophisticated Abbey: Live at the Keystone Korner is a live album by jazz vocalist Abbey Lincoln. It was recorded during March 1980 at the Keystone Korner in San Francisco, California, and was released in 2015 by HighNote Records. On the album, Lincoln is joined by pianist Phil Wright, double bassist James Leary, and drummer Doug Sides.

Another recording from the same engagement, titled Love Having You Around: Live at the Keystone Korner Vol. 2, was released by HighNote in 2016.

== Reception ==
Professional ratings
Review scores
Source	Rating
Audiophile Audition	4/5 stars
Jazzwise	3/5 stars

In a review for Jazzwise, Kevin Le Gendre wrote: "In this centenary year of Billie Holiday's birth, the release of a concert performance that brings any kind of attention to Lincoln, the singer who upheld her spirit perhaps more than anyone, is welcome... None of her sidemen are really 'name' players yet they provide simpatico and sensitive support, responding well to her leisurely time for the most part, and swinging without excess bluster."

Anders Griffen of The New York City Jazz Record described the album as "an outstanding set," and stated: "This appearance at Keystone Korner marks the beginning of Lincoln's music reclaiming the vanguard of her livelihood... the whole group... displays tremendous rapport... With great live sound in an intimate setting, a nuanced program and a killing band, this is truly an unearthed gem."

Dusted Magazine's Derek Taylor noted that the album finds Lincoln "regaling a receptive audience and adopting the after-hours chanteuse style of her greatest influence, Billie Holiday," and commented: "The music here works as a decent placeholder of where she was prior, plying her trade on the small stage to commensurate applause with nothing to prove and a legacy already secure."

Writing for Audiophile Audition, John Sunier remarked: "In this somewhat eclectic session, Abbey runs through a set list of original material, standards, and songs that appear to have a close association with her causes. Backed by a sympathetic trio, she sings and talks her way with warmth and intimacy through the numbers... This is a welcomed addition to the Abbey Lincoln discography."

The editors of NPR Music included the album in their list of best historical releases of 2015, as did David Johnson of Indiana Public Media.

== Track listing ==
1. "Painted Lady" (Abbey Lincoln) – 5:32
2. "Long as You're Living" (Julian Priester, Tommy Turrentine, Oscar Brown, Jr.) – 4:30
3. "Spoken Introduction" – 0:24
4. "Somos Novios (It's Impossible)" (Armando Manzanero) – 5:15
5. "Sophisticated Lady" (Duke Ellington, Mitchell Parish, Irving Mills) / "There Are Such Things" (Stanley Adams, George W. Meyer, Abel Baer) / "Con Alma" (Dizzy Gillespie, Abbey Lincoln) – 9:58
6. "Whistling Away the Dark" (Henry Mancini, Johnny Mercer) – 4:59
7. "Spoken Introduction" – 0:40
8. "People In Me" (Abbey Lincoln) – 5:29
9. "The Nearness of You" (Hoagy Carmichael, Ned Washington) / "For All We Know" (J. Fred Coots, Sam M. Lewis) – 6:14
10. "Golden Lady" (Stevie Wonder) – 4:42
11. "God Bless the Child" (Billie Holiday, Arthur Herzog Jr.) – 6:23

== Personnel ==
- Abbey Lincoln – vocals
- Phil Wright – piano
- James Leary – double bass
- Doug Sides – drums
