= Love Having You Around: Live at the Keystone Korner Vol. 2 =

Live album by Abbey Lincoln
- Released: 2016
- Recorded: March 1980
- Venue: Keystone Korner, San Francisco, California
- Genre: Jazz
- Length: 54:08
- Label: HighNote; HCD7297
- Producer: David Fabilli, Joe Fields

Abbey Lincoln chronology
Sophisticated Abbey: Live at the Keystone Korner (2015)	Love Having You Around: Live at the Keystone Korner Vol. 2 (2016)

Love Having You Around: Live at the Keystone Korner Vol. 2 is a live album by jazz vocalist Abbey Lincoln. It was recorded during March 1980 at the Keystone Korner in San Francisco, California, and was released in 2016 by HighNote Records. On the album, Lincoln is joined by pianist Phil Wright, double bassists James Leary and Art Washington, and drummer Doug Sides.

Another recording from the same engagement, titled Sophisticated Abbey: Live at the Keystone Korner, was released by HighNote in 2015.

== Reception ==
Professional ratings
Review scores
Source	Rating
Jazzwise	4/5 stars

In a review for Jazzwise, Peter Quinn praised the rendition of "Driva Man", originally recorded in 1960 for the Max Roach album We Insist!, "here stripped down to just voice and percussion with Sides' relentless snare hit symbolising the crack of the whip," and described "Little Girl Blue" as "heartbreakingly tender."

Anders Griffen of The New York City Jazz Record wrote: "These March 1980 sets from The Keystone Korner are a treasure. This was during something of a musical resurgence as the '70s consisted of more acting as well as teaching and study. In 1980 the powerful Lincoln returns, at once more refined and more versatile."

Dusted Magazine's Derek Taylor noted that, at the time of the recording, Lincoln's "early career milestone as a civil rights crucible in jazz had... given way to a broader mantle as a member of the idiom's songstress royalty and the program reflects the shift in repertoire." He expressed admiration for her "engaged and amiable" demeanor, her "skill at negotiating an elaborate lyric," and her "earthy inflections."

Writing for Jazz Weekly, George W. Harris stated that the album finds Lincoln "in vintage form," and described her sidemen as "both flexible and in the pocket, just right for this kind of vocalist who can take you to the church hall or street corner in seconds flat." He commented: "Her rich voice swings with Ted Williams' fluidity... and her vibrato is gorgeously supple... The sound quality is acceptable; the music quality is essential."

== Track listing ==
1. "Talkin' to the Sun" (Abbey Lincoln) – 4:55
2. "Love Having You Around" (Stevie Wonder) – 6:34
3. "When Malindy Sings" (Oscar Brown, Jr., Paul Laurence Dunbar) – 8:03
4. "Little Girl Blue" (Richard Rodgers, Lorenz Hart) – 4:34
5. "Driva Man" (Max Roach, Oscar Brown, Jr.) – 2:25
6. "Living Room" (Max Roach, Abbey Lincoln) – 5:04
7. "Rainbow" (Melba Liston, Abbey Lincoln) – 4:35
8. "Throw It Away" (Abbey Lincoln) – 7:56
9. "Africa" (John Coltrane, Abbey Lincoln) – 7:50
10. "Closing Remarks" – 1:59

== Personnel ==
- Abbey Lincoln – vocals
- Phil Wright – piano
- James Leary – double bass (tracks: 1–8, 10)
- Art Washington – double bass (track 9)
- Doug Sides – drums
