= A Turtle's Dream =

Studio album by Abbey Lincoln
- Released: 1995
- Recorded: May 29, 1994; August 29, 1994; November 7–8, 1994
- Studio: Clinton Recording Studios, New York City
- Genre: Jazz
- Length: 1:08:56
- Label: Verve, Gitanes Jazz; 314 527 382-2
- Producer: Jean-Philippe Allard

Abbey Lincoln chronology
| The Music is the Magic (1994) | A Turtle's Dream (1995) | Who Used to Dance (1997) |

A Turtle's Dream is an album by jazz vocalist Abbey Lincoln. It was recorded during May, August, and November, 1994, at Clinton Recording Studios in New York City, and was released in 1995 by Verve Records and Gitanes Jazz Productions. On the album, Lincoln is joined by pianist Rodney Kendrick, double bassist Charlie Haden, and drummer Victor Lewis, plus a string section and seven guest musicians: saxophonist Julien Lourau, trumpeter Roy Hargrove, pianist Kenny Barron, guitarists Pat Metheny and Lucky Peterson, and double bassists Christian McBride and Michael Bowie.

== Reception ==
Professional ratings
Review scores
| Source | Rating |
|---|---|
| AllMusic | 4/5 stars |
| Entertainment Weekly | A− |
| MusicHound Jazz | 4.5/5 stars |
| The Penguin Guide to Jazz | 4/4 stars |
| The Rolling Stone Jazz & Blues Album Guide | 3/5 stars |
| The Virgin Encyclopedia of Jazz | 4/5 stars |

A Turtle's Dream was nominated for Best Jazz Vocal Performance at the 38th Annual Grammy Awards.

Stephen Holden of The New York Times awarded the album first place in his annual adult-pop consumer guide, calling it "profoundly beautiful," and stating that Lincoln "suggests what Billie Holiday might have become had she overcome her personal demons and survived into her 60's. A piercing pain is balanced by an exhilarating sense of self-determination and a childlike wonder."

Entertainment Weekly's Chip Deffaa wrote: "Unhurried, sagacious, and original, [Lincoln] makes wise use of her limited vocal range... At her most penetrating... she offers not just entertainment, but a kind of spiritual nourishment."

Critic Gary Giddins described the album as "Lincoln's most expressive tour de force," and included it in his list of the best jazz records of 1995, commenting: "For more than half a century, a jazz diva was almost by definition a singer crying for her man. Lincoln has turned that around—never with greater emotional resolve than on this sublime album."

In an article for the Chicago Tribune, Howard Reich noted that, on the album, Lincoln "attains a new expressive depth and ardor." He remarked: "Probably the best recording of her career, A Turtle's Dream documents an artist who has pared down her means and her message to their essence. Not a note is wasted, not a phrase is unnecessary... Not since Billie Holiday's sublime final recordings has a female jazz vocalist expressed pain and yearning so eloquently."

The authors of The Penguin Guide to Jazz Recordings awarded the album a full 4 stars, and stated: "One of the joys of the record... is flicking through and identifying one dream line-up after another... only to find that the saxophone solo you've just swooned to... is by the relatively unknown Lourau."

== Track listing ==
1. "Throw It Away" (Abbey Lincoln) – 5:44
2. "A Turtle's Dream" (Laurent Cugny, Abbey Lincoln) – 6:29
3. "Down Here Below" (Abbey Lincoln) – 8:49
4. "Nature Boy" (eden ahbez) – 5:05
5. "Avec le temps" (Léo Ferré) – 5:40
6. "Should've Been" (Abbey Lincoln) – 7:58
7. "My Love Is You" (Abbey Lincoln) – 5:43
8. "Storywise" (Abbey Lincoln) – 4:21
9. "Hey, Lordy Mama" (Abbey Lincoln, Nina Simone) – 7:13
10. "Not to Worry" (Abbey Lincoln) – 5:47
11. "Being Me" (Abbey Lincoln) – 6:16

== Personnel ==
- Abbey Lincoln – vocals
- Rodney Kendrick – piano
- Charlie Haden – bass
- Victor Lewis – drums

Guests

- Julien Lourau – soprano saxophone, tenor saxophone (tracks 2, 4, 7–8, 10)
- Pat Metheny – guitars (tracks 1, 5–6, 11)
- Roy Hargrove – trumpet (tracks 4, 8)
- Kenny Barron – piano (tracks 3, 11)
- Christian McBride – double bass (tracks 4, 8)
- Michael Bowie – double bass (tracks 7, 9)
- Lucky Peterson – guitar, background vocals (track 9)

Strings

- Pierre Blanchard – violin
- Vincent Pagliarin – violin
- Sandra Billingslea – violin
- Frédéric Fymard – viola
- Anne-Gaelle Bisquay – cello
- Marc Gilet – cello
- John Robinson – cello
