= Kendra Shank =

American musical artist

- Born: April 23, 1958 (age 68); Woodland, California, U.S.
- Genres: Jazz
- Occupation: Musician
- Instruments: Vocals, guitar
- Years active: 1980s–present
- Labels: Mapleshade, Jazz Focus, Challenge
- Website: www.kendrashank.com

Kendra Shank (born April 23, 1958) is an American jazz vocalist.

== Career ==
Shank's mother was an actress and playwright and her father was a playwright and teacher at the University of California. When she was five, she appeared onstage with her mother in Threepenny Opera. In her early teens she started playing guitar.

Shank attended Pacific Lutheran University and the University of Washington, receiving a degree in art and French. During the 1980s, she performed in clubs in Seattle as a folk singer, accompanying herself on acoustic guitar. In 1989 she studied with jazz vocalist Jay Clayton at Cornish College of the Arts. She was a busker on the streets and subways of Paris and while in Paris heard her first Billie Holiday album. Although she had been working as a folk singer in clubs, she bought a method book to learn a few jazz standards.

In the early 1990s, she went on tour with Bob Dorough. Shirley Horn saw her perform and became a mentor, introducing at the Village Vanguard in 1992. Mapleshade released Shank's debut album Afterglow on which she sang and played guitar. She met pianist Frank Kimbrough through Horn, and he became a member of her quartet, which recorded A Spirit Free (Challenge, 2007), a tribute to her mentor and friend Abbey Lincoln. She has also recorded with Gary Bartz, Peter Leitch, Ben Monder, John Stowell, and Larry Willis, among others.

== Discography ==
=== As leader ===
- Afterglow with Larry Willis, Gary Bartz (Mapleshade, 1994)
- Wish (Jazz Focus, 1998)
- Reflections (Jazz Focus, 2000)
- A Spirit Free: Abbey Lincoln Songbook (Challenge, 2006)
- Mosaic (Challenge, 2009)
- New York Conversations with John Stowell (TCB, 2013)
- Half Moon: Live in New York with Geoffrey Keezer (Ride Symbol, 2016)

=== As guest ===
- Abbey Lincoln, Over the Years (Verve, 2000)
