= No More (1944 song) =

1944 song by Toots Camarata and Bob Russell

"No More" is a song with music by Toots Camarata, lyrics by Bob Russell, and vocals by Billie Holiday. It was recorded on October 4, 1944 in New York City, and distributed by Decca Records. The song is sometimes listed as "(You Ain't Gonna Bother Me) No More".

According to one source, Holiday referred to "No More" as one of her favorite songs.

== Personnel ==
- Toots Camarata – conductor, arranger
- Billie Holiday – vocals
- Russ Case – trumpet
- Hymie Schertzer – alto saxophone
- Jack Cressey – alto saxophone
- Larry Binyon – tenor saxophone
- Paul Ricci – tenor saxophone
- Dave Bowman – piano
- Carl Kress – guitar
- Haig Stephens – bass
- Johnny Blowers – drums

== Other notable vocal versions ==
Other singers who have performed it include:

- Dinah Washington – Dinah Jams (1954)
- Abbey Lincoln – Abbey Lincoln's Affair (1956), Abbey Sings Billie (1989)
- June Christy – Fair and Warmer! (1957)
- Lorez Alexandria (1964)
- Carmen McRae - for her album Alive! (1965).
- Irene Kral - Better Than Anything (1963)
- Jeri Southern – When Your Heart's on Fire (1957).
