= Taru Alexander =

American jazz drummer (born 1967)

- Born: Taru Alexander; December 18, 1967 (age 57); Brooklyn, New York, U.S.
- Genres: Jazz
- Occupation: Drummer
- Instrument: Drums
- Formerly of: Roland Alexander's quintet; Roy Hargrove quintet; Carlos Garnett quartet
- Website: TaruAlexander.com

Taru Alexander (born December 18, 1967) is an American jazz drummer, born and raised in Brooklyn, New York. He is a son of Roland Alexander, an American post-bop jazz tenor saxophone player from Boston, Massachusetts.

Alexander started to play drums at the early age of seven years old surrounded by jazz musicians like Freddie Hubbard, Reggie Workman, Gary Bartz and Kiani Zawadi. At the age of nine he was studying drums under the leadership of master drummers Rudy Collins, Andre Strobert and Walter Perkins at the New Muse music school in Brooklyn, New York. By the age of thirteen, Taru started to perform professionally with his father Roland Alexander's quintet (Roland Alexander-tenor saxophone, Kiani Zawadi-trombone, Hilton Ruiz-piano, Paul Brown-bass). At the same time, he started to study drums with Justin DiCioccio at the La Guardia Music & Art High School in New York.

== Cooperations ==
While still studying at the age of sixteen, Taru recorded his first album as a side man accompanying Fred Ho Afro-Asian Ensemble on the Black Saint record label. Soon after, he established himself at the New York jazz scene and became one of the sough after drummers. He also toured US with the Moe Better Blues Band & The Drums of Fire bands. Taru is in 2018 actively performing with Williamsburg Music Allstars and various musicians throughout the New York, USA and Europe.

Alexander performed domestically and internationally with: Abbey Lincoln, Betty Carter, Roland Alexander, Roy Hargrove, Rodney Kendrick, Branford Marsalis, Danny Mixon, Gary Bartz, Carlos Garnett, Reggie Workman, Bill Saxton, Kenny Davis, Lonnie Plaxico, Bill Lee, Tommy Turntine, Bill Saxton, Gary Bartz, Eddie Comes, Murgrew Miller, Taurus Mateen, Roland Alexander, Eric Alexander, Reggie Workman, Branford Marsilis, Wynton Marsilis, Gerry Eastman, Ron Burton, Paul Brown, Juni Booth, Kiani Zawadi, Eddie Henderson, Abbie Lincoln, Betty Carter, Sweet Georgia Brown, Fred Ho, Sam Furnace, Hank Jones, Roy Hargrove, Benny Green, Christian McBride, Steven Scott, JD Allen, Peter Bernstein, Monte Croft, Don Sickler, Bobby Watson, Clifton Anderson, Tadataka Unno, Amin Salim, Ronnie Mathews, Dywane Burno, Justin Robinson, Curtis Lundy, Michael Marcus, Sonny Simmons and many more... He has a musical group called The Taru Alexander Quartet.

== Clubs ==
Alexander played and performed in jazz clubs in New York - FAT Tuesdays, Sweet Basil, Bradley's, The original Smalls Paradise in Harlem, Blue Note, Village Vanguard, The Village Gate, The Garage, The St. Nick's Pub, Tavern on the Green, Smalls Jazz Club, 55 bar, Up and Over jazz club, The East, Pumpkins, The Blue Cornet, Paris Blues, Williamsburg Music Center, Sister's Place, Zinc Bar, Lenox Lounge.

== Tours and festivals ==
- Carlos Garnett quartet – European tour, The intone Jazz festival with Paul Zauner, Panama Jazz Festival in 2012
- Cosmosimatics Band with Michael Marcus and Sonny Simmons - European tour, JazzWerk Festival in Ukraine in 2007
- Roy Hargrove quintet - European, USA & Caribbean Islands tour, Lionel Hampton Jazz Festival in Idaho USA with Hank Jones and Benny Green with Roy Hargrove quintet, Barbados Jazz Festival in 2004 & 2005
- Roberta Gambarini – Barbados (jazz festival) & Chicago (jazz showcase) in 2004 & 2005
- Roland Alexander quintet – New York jazz scene from 1981 - 2004
- The Drums of Fire with the band leader Morjim (father of the famous rapper Akon) – Canadian tour in 1992
- Abbie Lincoln – European & Canadian tour in 1995
- Rodney Kendrick trio & quintet - European & Canadian tour, Montreal Jazz Festival in 1993 & 1994
- Fred Ho Afro Asian Ensemble, West Coast USA tour and concerts in Paris in 1986

== Discography ==
During his three decades of professional career, Alexander appeared as a side man on more than fifty albums.

Leader

As a leader, Alexander recorded in 2014 album titled "KoJo Time" released under the Jazz Leadsheet label paying tribute to his father, tenor saxophone player Roland Alexander by playing his original compositions.

Sideman

| Year | Album | Artist | Credits |
|---|---|---|---|
| 2008 | Brown Skin Gal | Gerry Eastman | Main Personnel, Drums |
| 2006 | Harlem Homecoming | Salim Washington | Drums, Drum |
| 1997 | Turn Pain into Power | Fred Ho | Drums |
| 1997 | We Don't Die, We Multiply | Rodney Kendrick | Drums |
| 1996 | Resurgence | Carlos Garnett | Drums |
| 1996 | Who Used to Dance | Abbey Lincoln | Drums |
| 1995 | Last Chance for Common Sense | Rodney Kendrick | Drums |
| 1994 | The Secrets of Rodney Kendrick | Rodney Kendrick | Drums |
| 1985 | Tomorrow Is Now! | Fred Houn | Drums |
| none | Harlem Jazz Machine | Melvin Vines | Personnel |

== Awards ==
In 1996 Taru was honored with a proclamation for his musical achievements by Brooklyn borough president Marty Markowitz alongside jazz drummer Max Roach.
