= I Didn't Know About You =

Song by Duke Ellington and Bob Russell

"I Didn't Know About You" is a song composed by Duke Ellington, with lyrics written by Bob Russell. Recorded in 1944 with vocal by Joya Sherrill, it was based on an instrumental first recorded by Ellington in 1942 under the title "Sentimental Lady", featuring Johnny Hodges on alto saxophone.

The 1942 instrumental reached number one on the Harlem Hit Parade in 1943 and was the B-side to Duke Ellington's previous number one, "A Slip Of the Lip (Can Sink a Ship)", which had reached the top spot a week before.

The recording by Count Basie & His Orchestra (vocal by Thelma Carpenter) briefly reached the No. 21 position on the Billboard charts in 1945 and other recordings available that year were by Duke Ellington, Mildred Bailey, Jo Stafford and Lena Horne.

== Reception ==
Alec Wilder wrote that it "works well as a song in [the] series of Ellington instrumentals with Russell lyrics. The main strain is the most melodic, vocally, of the three Russell wrote lyrics for." (The other two songs were “Do Nothing till You Hear from Me” and “Don't Get Around Much Anymore”, based respectively on "Concerto for Cootie" and "Never No Lament".)

== Other notable recordings ==
- June Christy - The Misty Miss Christy (1956)
- Ella Fitzgerald - Ella Fitzgerald Sings the Duke Ellington Song Book (1957)
- Abbey Lincoln - Abbey Lincoln's Affair... A Story of a Girl in Love (1957)
- Patti Page - In the Land of Hi-Fi (1956)
- Jo Stafford - Jo + Jazz (1960)
- Charlie Rouse and Thelonious Monk on Monk's album Straight No Chaser (1966)
