= Panama Jazz Festival =

Music festival

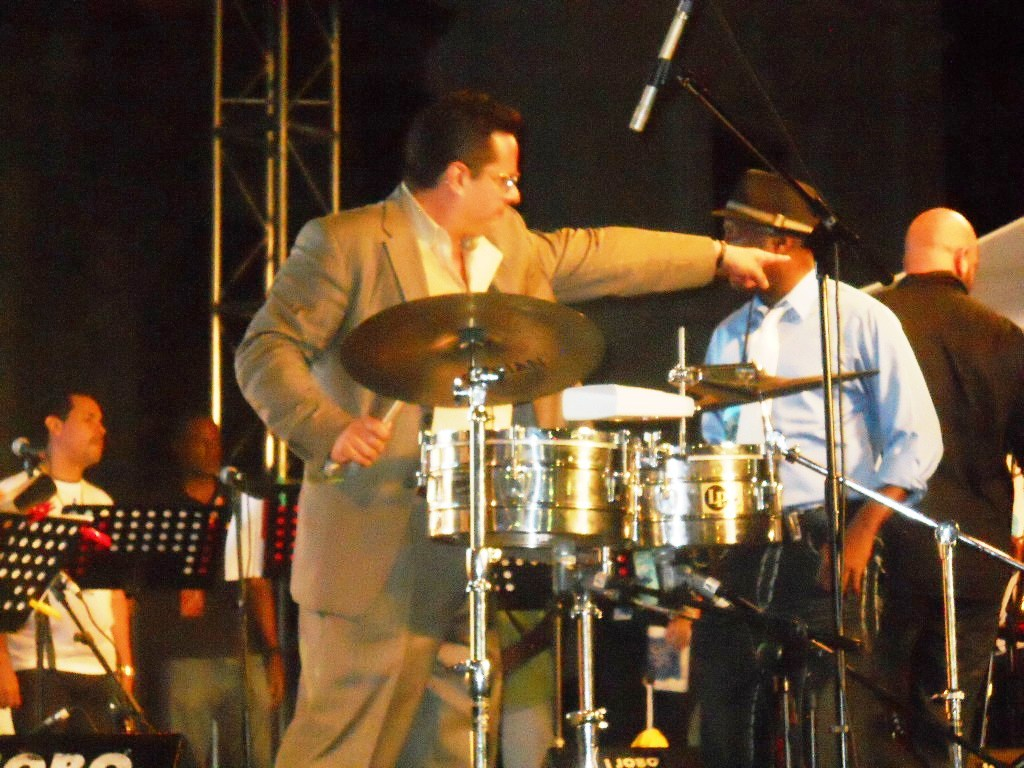
Tito Puente Jr. at the Panama Jazz Festival in 2012.

The Panama Jazz Festival was founded in September 2003 by pianist and Grammy winner Danilo Pérez.

== History ==
Perez founded the festival with the intent to improve people's lives through the shared experience of music.

After almost 20 years, the Panama Jazz Festival has become a cultural tourism attraction with more than 500,000 people from various latitudes visiting. The festival is produced by a team of 2 directors (Patricia Zarate, Executive Director and Danilo Perez, Artistic Director), 70 coordinators, 500 volunteers, 300 national and international musicians, and about 200 collaborators from all sectors of Panama.

The festival provides a week of master classes by musicians from Berklee College of Music, Berklee Global Jazz Institute, and the New England Conservatory. Other institutions that have participated in the festival include the Golandsky Institute, Conservatory of Music of Puerto Rico, University of Massachusetts Amherst, Cambridge Rindge and Latin School, Sienna Jazz Foundation, Thelonious Monk Institute of Jazz, New York Jazz Academy, and the Paris Conservatory.

Musicians who have attended the festival include Kenny Barron, Rubén Blades, Terri Lyne Carrington, Billy Cobham, Jack DeJohnette, Nnenna Freelon, Herbie Hancock, Stanley Jordan, Joe Lovano, Ellis Marsalis Jr., John Patitucci, Dianne Reeves, Wayne Shorter, Esperanza Spalding, Mike Stern, Chucho Valdés, Randy Weston, and Lizz Wright.

Invited musicians teach master classes where students from Latin America and the world come together to learn from the international masters of jazz. Among the musicians who have given lectures are Kenny Barron, Brian Blade, Ran Blake, Terri Lyne Carrington, Regina Carter, Santi Debriano, Jack DeJohnette, Nnenna Freelon, Tia Fuller, Eddie Gómez, Craig Handy, Charlie Hunter, Stanley Jordan, Joe Lovano, John Patitucci, Marco Pignataro, Kurt Rosenwinkel, David Sanchez, Wayne Shorter, Janis Siegel, Ben Street, Steve Turre, Chucho Valdés, and Randy Weston.

The festival supports the year-round educational programs of Danilo Perez Foundation, which brings art and music to children from all socio-economic status in the Republic of Panama. The idea for the Danilo Perez Foundation originated in the 1965 when Danilo Perez Urriola (father of the pianist) started his educational programs with children of poverty in Panama and created an elementary and high school curriculum where all classes were taught through improvisation, composition, and the performance of music. Since 2009, chilean saxophonist and music therapist Patricia Zarate de Perez has directed the festival implementing new technology, expanding national and international collaborations, systematizing all aspects of the production of the festival, transforming the event into a self sustainable institution.

== Recordings ==
Panama Suite (2006) was recorded with students and faculty of Berklee College of Music and the New England Conservatory to commemorate five years of the Panama Jazz Festival. All tracks were composed and directed by Danilo Perez and produced by Billy Herron and Berklee College of Music.

== Associated schools and organizations ==
- Berklee College of Music and Berklee Global Jazz Institute
- City of Knowledge
- Danilo Perez Foundation
- Embassy of the United States
- Embassy of Spain
- Embassy of France
- New England Conservatory
- Panamanian Government: Presidency, Ministry of Tourism, Ministry of Culture, and Panama City mayor
- University of Massachusetts
- Thelonious Monk Institute of Jazz
- New York Jazz Avademy
- Santiago de Chile's Conservatory
- Golandsky Institute
- Puerto Rico's Conservatory
- Paris Conservatory

=== Clinics" that take place during the Festival ===
An important part of the festival is musical education, it consists of all the invited artists having master classes called "Musical Clinics", where students from all over Latin America and the world come together to learn from International Jazz teachers. Among the international artists who have given lectures are Wayne Shorter, Chucho Valdés, Jack De Johnette, John Patitucci, Joe Lovano, Randy Weston, Brian Blade, Kurt Rosenwinkel, Nnenna Freelon, Kenny Barron, Marco Pignataro, Eddie Gómez, Regina Carter, Steve Turre, Stanley Jordan, Janis Siegel, David Sánchez, Charlie Hunter, Tia Fuller, and many more.

The Jazz Festival has also offered master classes in Panamanian Folklore, dance, classical music groups (with renowned national and international musicians and the best of the New England Conservatory of Music, thanks to the Berklee College of Music Production and Engineering Department), and many other topics.

== International artists ==
- In 2003: Danilo Pérez Trio (Danilo Perez on piano, Ben Street on bass, Adam Cruz on drums); Kenny Barron on piano (Kenny Barron on piano, Kiyoshi Obata on bass, Kim Thompson on drums); Mike Stern on guitar (Bob Franceschini on sax, Lincoln Goines on bass, Lionel Cordew on drums); Steve Turre on trombone (Hector Martignon on piano, Steve Kirby on bass, Obed Calvaire on drums, Richie Flores on percussion); Carlos Garnett on tenor saxophone from Panama; Regina Carter on violin (David Budway on piano, Mayra Casales on percussion, Alvester Garnett on drums, Chris Lightcap on bass); Charlie Hunter on Guitar; Barbara Wilson on Voice; Danilo Perez Sr. on Voice.
- In 2005: Jack DeJohnette on drums and piano (Danilo Perez on piano, John Patitucci on bass, Joe Lovano on saxophone, Ricaurte Villarreal on percussion); Joe Lovano on tenor saxophone (Dennis Irwin on bass, William Drewes on sax, Francisco Mela on drums, James Weidman on piano, Judi Silvano on voice); John Patitucci double bass and bass guitar; Victor Paz on trumpet from Panama; Janis Siegel on voice (Steve Hass on drums, Darek Oles on bass, Alan Pasqua on piano).
- In 2006: Randy Weston on piano (feat. Alex Blake on bass, Neil Clarke on percussion) from U.S; Kurt Rosenwinkel on guitar from U.S; David Sánchez on saxophone from Puerto Rico; Carlos Garnett on tenor saxophone from Panama; Mark Turner on saxophone and clarinet from U.S; Victor Paz on trumpet from Panama; Santi Debriano on bass (Patricia Vlieg on voice) from U.S.
- In 2007: Edmar Castañeda on Harp from Colombia; Nnenna Freelon on Voice; Carlos Garnett on Tenor Saxophone; Panamanian Band (feat. Danilo Perez on piano, Billy Cobham on bass, Santi Debriano on drums, Jorge Sylvester on sax, Renato Thoms); Victor Paz on trumpet; Banda Tributo a Chile on saxophone (feat. Patricia Zarate on sax, Mili Bermejo on voice, Francisco Molina on drums, Nando Michelin on piano, Dan Greenspan on bass).
- In 2008: Tia Fuller on saxophone, Kim Thompson on drums; Kelley Johnson on voice (Graciela Nunez on violin, Yomira John on voice); Stanley Jordon on guitar; Catherine Rusell on Voice; Dave Samuels on vibraphone (Caribbean Jazz Project).
- In 2009: Wayne Shorter on saxophone feat. Brian Blade on drums, Danilo Pérez on piano, John Patitucci on bass; Luba Mason on voice feat. Rubén Blades on voice, Jimmy Haslip on bass, Hubert Laws on flute and saxophone; Marco Pignataro Quintet with Marco Pignataro on saxophone feat. Eddie Gómez on bass, Matt Marvuglio on flute, Mark Kramer on piano, Billy Drummondon drums from Italy; Chucho Valdés on Piano.
- In 2010: Lizz Wright on Voice; Carlos Garnett on Tenor Saxophone; Jamey Haddad on Percussion; Joe Lovano on Tenor Saxophone; Terri Lyne Carrington on Drum and Voice; Ellis Marsalis Jr. on Piano; Juanito Pascual on Guitar; John Patitucci on Double bass and electric bass.
- In 2011: Ben Street on Double bass; Adam Cruz on Drum set; Tom Patitucci on Guitar; Rudresh Mahanthappa on Saxophone from Italy; Paoli Mejias on percussion; John Patitucci on Double bass and guitar; Claudia Acuña on voice, Jon Cowherd on piano, Juan Herrera on bass, Edgardo Serka on drums; Brian Lynch on trumpet, Alain Perez on percussion; Conrad Herwig on trombone, Lucques Curtes on bass, William O'Connell on piano, Pedro Martinez on percussion.
- In 2012: John Scofield on guitar, Ben Street on bass, Bill Stewart on drums; Charlie Sepúlveda on trumpet, Raul Maldonado; Luis Bonilla on Trombone; Omara Portuondo on Voice; Chucho Valdés on Piano; Carlos Garnett on saxophone, Carlton Holmes on bass, Taru Alexander on drums; Tito Puente Jr. on percussion, Rosado Marlow, Teri Roiger, John Menegon; Jed Levi on saxophone, Alvester Garnett on drums, Thomson Neekland on bass, Misha Tsiganov on piano; Adalberto Santiago on voice.
- In 2013: Herbie Hancock on Piano; Wayne Shorter Quartet with Wayne Shorter on saxophone feat. Brian Blade on drums, Danilo Pérez on piano, John Patitucci on bass; Bill Frisell on Guitar; Susana Baca on Voice.
- In 2014: Lizz Wright on Voice; Kenny Garret on Saxophone; HBC Trio feat Scott Henderson on guitar, Jeff Berlin on bass, Dennis Chambers on drums; Pisco Trio with George Garzone on saxophone, Jorge Perez on drums, Ehud Ettun on bass; Nedelka Prescod on Voice; Shea Welsh on Guitar; Michelle Coltrane on Voice; Kevin Harris on Piano.
- In 2015: Children of the Light with Danilo Perez on piano, John Patitucci on bass, Brian Blade on drums; Benny Golson on Saxophone; Brian Blade & the Fellowship Band (Brian Blade on drums, Jon Cowherd on piano, Chris Thomas on bass, Myron Walden on sax, Melvin Butler on clarinet; Pedrito Martinez on Percussion; Miguel Zenón on Saxophone; Rubén Blades on Voice; MAPUJAZZ ft Claudia Acuña on Voice; Omar Alfanno on Voice and composer; Phil Ranelin on Trombone; Uwe Kropinski & Michael Heupel on Guitar and flute).
- In 2016: Randy Weston on Piano; David Murray on Saxophone; Terry Lyne Carrington on Drums; Geri Allen on Piano; Danny Rivera on Voice; Dave Douglas on Trumpet; Dominique Eade on Voice; Rudresh Mahnthappa on Saxophone; Tony Vega on Voice, Percussion from Puerto Rico; John Patitucci on Double bass, bass guitar; Tom Patitucci on Guitar; Arild Andersen on Double bass; Tal Gamlieli on Double bass.
- In 2017: Esperanza Spalding on Voice, Double bass; Dianne Reeves on Voice; Romero Lubambo on Guitar; Children of the Light with Danilo perez on piano, John Patitucci on drums, Brian Blade on drums; Terri Lyne Carrington on Drums; Bill Dobbins on Piano; John Patitucci Electric Guitar Quartet – Adam Rogers, Steve Cardenas (2 Guitars, bass, drums).
- In 2018: Wayne Shorter Quartet on saxophone feat. Danilo Perez on piano, John Patitucci on bass, and Brian Blade on drums; Panamonk Revisited feat. Danilo Perez on piano, Ben Street on bass and Terri Lyne Carrington on drums; Chucho Valdés Quartet on Piano, bass, drums, percussion; Ran Blake on Piano; Luciana Souza on Voice; Santi Debriano Quartet on sax (feat. Craig Handy on piano, Bill O'Conell on bass and Tommy Campbell on drums; Marco Pignataro Quartet on sax (feat. Lefteris Kordis on piano, Ben Street on bass, Terri Lyne Carrington on drums); Bill Dobbins on Piano.
- In 2019: Alex Blake Jr. on bass; Andre Hayward on trombone; Lucía Pulido on voice; Russel Blake on Bass; Gunhild on trombone; Danilo Pérez's Global Messengers feat Farayi Malek on voice, Vasilis Kostas on lauto, Layth Al-Rubaye on violin and voice, Naseen Alatrash on cello, Tareq Rantisi on percussion and Danilo Pérez on piano; Janee Bunnet and Maqueque fet Jane Bunnet on saxophone and flute, Melvis Santa on voice and percussion, María Paz on voice and congas, Dánae Olano on piano, Tailin Marrero on bass, Yissy García on drums; Andre Hayward on trombone; Corazantes feat Lucia Pulido on voice, Misha Marks on guitar, Amanda Irarrazabal on bass; Rotem Sivan on guitar; PJ Andersson trombone; Jas Kayser on drums.
- In 2020: Adam Cruz on drums; Cyrus Chesnut on piano; Danilo Pérez on piano; Chris Collins on clarinet; Diane Reeves on voice; John Patitucci on bass; Ravi Coltrane on saxophone; Terri Lyne Carrington on drums; Ben Street on bass.
- In 2021: Wayne Shorter on sax; Kurt Elling on voice; Terri Lyne Carrington on drums; John Patitucci on bass; Cyrus Chestnut on piano; Joe Lovano on sax; Judi Silvano on voice; Brian Blade on drums; Rogerio Boccato on percussion; Farayi Malek on voice; Faris Ishaq on flute; Paolo Damiani on bass; Marco Pignataro on sax; Ben Street on bass; Kris Davis on piano; Val Jeanty on drums.
- In 2022: Global Jazz Womxn featuring Patricia Zárate Pérez (Chile), Camila Cortina (Cuba), Ciara Moser (Irlanda-Austria), and Francesca Remigi (Italia); Danilo Perez (Panama); Aga Derlak (Polonia); Anastassiya Petrova (Kazajstán); Javier Arau (USA)
- In 2023: Children of the Light with Danilo Perez on piano, John Patitucci on bass, Brian Blade on drums; Chase Morrin Trio (USA); Farayi Malek (USA); Erika Ender (Panamá); Catherine Russell (USA); Gilberto Santa Rosa (Puerto Rico); Nadia Washington Quartet (USA); Roman Díaz (Cuba); Proyecto Acústico (El Salvador); Global Jazz Womxn featuring Patricia Zárate (Chile), Lihi Haruvi (Israel), Ciara Moser (Irlanda-Austria), Zahili González (Cuba), Ivanna Cuesta (República Dominicana), Afrodisiaco (Panamá).
- In 2024: Bill Pierce (USA), Andrew McAnsh (Canada), Ron Savage (USA), Calixto Oviedo (Cuba), Brandon Wilkins (USA), Consuelo Candelaria (USA), Guy Barker (Londres), Marcus Moraes (Brasil), Marion Hayden (USA), Marshall Gilkes (USA), Maxine Gordon (USA), Michael Rodriguez (USA), Pablo Fagundes (Brasil), Ron Mahdi (USA), Zahili Zamora (Cuba), Global Jazz Womxn featuring Patricia Zárate (Chile), Lihi Haruvi (Israel), Ciara Moser (Irlanda-Austria), Zahili González (Cuba), Ivanna Cuesta (República Dominicana), Afrodisiaco (Panamá).

== National artists ==
- In 2003: Carlos Garnett (Saxophone)
- In 2006: Mauricio Smith (flute); Carlos Garnett (saxophone); Patricia Vlieg (Singer); Ricaurte Villarreal (Percussion);
- In 2013: Rubén Blades (Singer); Idania Dowman (Singer); Graciela "Chelín" Núñez (Violin)
- In 2014: Oscar Cruz Ensemble with Oscar Cruz on Drums, Luis Carlos Perez on Sax, Carlos Agrazal on Sax, Carlos Quiros on Bass, Isai Henriquezz on piano, and Daniel Jiménez on drums; Señor Loop with Iñaki Ireberri on guitar, Carlos Úcar on bass and Rodrigo Colón Sánchez on voice; Carlos Campos (pianist); Luci and The Soulbrokers.
- In 2015: Omar Alfanno (Singer Songwriter); Ruben Blades (Singer Songwriter)
- In 2016: Joshue Ashby and C3 Project (Violin); Andrés Carrizo (pianist); Carlos Méndez (Singer); Willie Panamá and his orchestra (singer); Reggie Johnson (Saxophone player); Alex Tesla (Singer); Luci and The Soul Brokers (Instrumental ensemble); Grupo Congo Generación Costeña (Instrumental ensemble); Samuel Batista (Saxophone); Ricardo Pinzón (Guitar); Nakeiltha "Nikki" Campbell (Singer); Embajadors de Fundación Danilo Pérez (Instrumental ensemble); Babito Do Carno (Guitarist); Ensamble Juvenil Fundación Danilo Pérez (Instrumental Ensemble); Pedro Sanjur (percussionist, arranger, composer); Anggie Viler (Flutist); Luis Carlos Pérez (Saxophonist); Carlos Agrazal (saxophonist)
- In 2017: Los Beachers (musical group); Joshue Ashby and C3 Project (Violin); Omar Díaz and El grupo Dedé (Percussionist, drummer and composer); Panama Jazz All Stars (Violeta Green's tribute); Back Tea Project (Violin, Guitar); Afrodisíaco (instrumental ensemble); Karla Lamboglia (Singer songwriter); Ricardo Pinzón (Guitarist); Los Nietos del Jazz (instrumental ensemble)
- In 2018: Santi Debriano (Contrabass); Carlos Agrazal (Saxophone); Chale Icaza (Drums); German Pinzon Jimenez (Guitar); Graciela Nuñez (Violin); Josue Ashby (Violin); Luis Carlos Pérez (Saxophone); Luz Acosta (Voice and bass); Oscar Cruz (Percussion); Samy y Sandra Sandoval (Voice); Roberto "Toto" Ruiz (Trumpet).
- In 2019: Alex Blake Jr. (Bass); Alex Blake Sr. (Trombone); Iván Barrios (Voice); Roberto Delgado (Bass)
- In 2020: Reggie Johnson (Saxophone); Danilo Pérez (Piano); Alfonso Lewis (Multi-Instrumentalist); Billy Herron (Guitar); Nikki Campbell (Percussion); Omar Diaz Herrera (Percussion); Osvaldo Ayala (Accordion); Ricardo Pinzón (Guitar); Rubén Blades (Songwriter); Samuel Batista (Piano)
- In 2021:Erika Ender (Singer songwriter); Rubén Blades (Singer songwriter); Carlos Campos (Piano); Carolina Pérez (Voice); Eliécer Izquierdo (Guitar)
- In 2022: Solange Arias (Singer); Idania Dowman (Singer); Mayra Hurley (Singer, actress); Coffeerized (Instrumental quartet); Ensamble de becarios FDP (Instrumental ensemble); Refined Jazz Band (Instrumental Quartet); Luz Acosta (Singer, bassist); Carlos Campos (Pianist); Juanita Acosta (Pianist); Samuel Barrios (Pianist, composer, educator); Sebastián Garzón (Drummer, percussionist, composer, educator, cultural gestor); Sahra González (Panacultura creator)
- In 2023: Afrodisiaco (Panamá), Calele & The Global Soul (Panamá), Geraldine Ehrman (Panamá), Idania Dowman (Panamá), Las Hijas del Jazz (Panamá), Harp Fusión (Panamá), The Luis Russell Collective (Panamá)
- In 2024: Billy Cobham (Panama/USA), Danilo Perez (Panamá), Alex Blake (Panamá/USA), Solinka (Panamá), Las Hijas del Jazz (Panamá), Afrodisiaco (Panamá), Jermaine Vásquez (Panamá).

== Music therapy symposium ==
The Music Therapy Symposium was founded in January 2013 by Chilean saxophonist, music therapist and executive director of the Panama Jazz Festival Patricia Zarate. The mission of the Latin American Symposium on Music Therapy is the dissemination of the theory and practice of music therapy in Latin America.

- In 2013, I Simposio:
  - Sharon Katz (South Africa), Music Therapy in Apartheid SudAfrica
  - Paola Casal (Panamá), Music Therapy in Panamá
  - Melany Taylor (Panamá), Music Therapy in Panamá
  - Cynthia Pimentel (México), Music Therapy with Children and Adults
  - Patricia Zárate (Chile), Music Therapy with Children and Adults
- In 2014, II Simposio:
  - Kathleen Howland (USA), Music Therapy & Alzheimer, Special Needs, Parkinson, The Power of Music and Therapy
  - Silvia Andreu (Chile), Music Therapy in Elementary School Setting, Well-being of teachers through Music Therapy, Music Therapy and Hearing Loss with Children
  - Patricia Zárate (Chile), Music and Extreme Poverty in Latin America
  - Jorge Montado (Argentina), Music Therapy in a Hospital setting with Elderly, The Training of a Music Therapist, From Chaos to Composition, Benefits if Music Therapy in Mental Health Community Settings.
  - Alfredo Hidrovo (Panamá), Music for Healing
  - Aleyda Duarte & Luis Carlos Perez (Panamá), The Changing Role of Music in Panama
  - Pedro Peña (Venezuela), From the Quality of Sound to the use of Music for Expression, Music as a Tool for Self Expression
  - Margarita Carreño & Kleiberth Mora (Venezuela), Network of Penitentiary Symphonic Orchestra's
- In 2015, III Simposio, Music Psychology:
  - Kathleen Howland (USA), Music Therapy in the Diagnosis and Treatment of Cancer, Introduction to Neurological Music Therapy (NMT), Psychology of Music – Why Music?
  - Juan Pablo Ruiz (Colombia), Using Music Therapy as a Tool to Treat Special Needs Children
  - Marlene Rodriguez-Wolf (Dominican Republic), Music Therapy in a Pediatric Oncology Unit, Music Therapy and Pain Management
  - Aleyda Duarte & Luis Carlos Perez (Panamá), Social Change through Music
  - Cecilia Di Prinzio (Argentina), A Teacher's Occupational Health from a Music Therapy Standpoint, Early Intervention
  - Mará Galán (Colombia), Music Therapy Activities Based on the Methodology of Electro-Acoustic Music
  - Melany Taylor (Panamá), Music Therapy in Panama
  - Patricia Zárate (Chile), The Therapeutic Effects of Jazz
  - Jorge Montaldo (Argentina), Music Therapy in a Hospital Setting, Corporeity and Music in Music Therapy. Testimonies from the XVI National Congress of Music Therapy in Argentina, Moving from Chaos into Composition. Immanence in the Training of a Music Therapist
  - Max Terán (Costa Rica), Music Therapy Workshop Autism and Executive Functions: Clinical Research from the approach of Abordaje Plurimodal
  - Sandra Schevetz (Panama), Musicoterapia and Cri Du Chat
  - Alejandre Sanchez (México), The use of Electro-Acoustic Devices in Music Therapy, Experience with children on the Autism Spectrum
- In 2016, IV Simposio, Medicine and Music:
  - Connie Tomaino (USA), Clinical Improvisation in Music Therapy, Music and Memory, Music and the Brain, Recovery of Speech through Music Therapy
  - Kathleen Howland (USA), An Introduction to Music Therapy and Medicine, Music Therapy and Speech/ Language Disorders, Music Therapy and Post Traumatic Stress Disorder (PTSD)
  - Juan José Capella (Venezuela), Systematic Musical Psychotherapy
  - Andrea Oyarzún (Chile), Music Therapy for People Diagnosed with HIV/AIDS
  - Juan Pablo Ruiz (Colombia), Interactive Workshop on Music Therapy
  - Melanie Taylor Herrera (Panamá), The Importance of Environment: Treating Adolescents with Disabilities
  - Stephanie Platzer, (USA), Music Therapy and Neurological Disorders
  - Aleida Duarte (Panamá), Music for Social Change
- In 2017 V Simposio, Music Therapy and Improvisation:
  - Colin Andrew Lee (USA), Music Therapy and Improvisation; Aesthetic Music Therapy; Music therapy Techniques for Neurological Advances in Nordoff Robbins Technique
  - Kathleen Howland (USA), Music Therapy and Cognition; Educational Curriculum for Music Therapy; Music therapy Techniques for Neurological Advances in Nordoff Robbins Technique
  - Juan Pablo Ruiz (Colombia), Interactive Workshop on Music Therapy; Music Therapy and Improvisation with children ages 0–6
  - Krystal Demaine (USA), Exploring the Musical Echolalia in Children; Teaching with Compassion in the Creative Therapies
  - Carolina Torres López (Colombia), Music Therapy Intervention and Development of Assertive and Empathic Skills in Adolescents Involved in School Bullying
  - Violeta Díaz (Chile), Anatomy of Cerebral Artists
  - Talia Girton (USA), The New Music Therapy Center of Panamá
  - Lucía Bertello (Panamá), The Effects of Musical Training of the Behavior and Emotional Wellness of Children Ages 5–13
  - Carolina Muñoz Lepe (Chile), Self-Care Workshop for Mothers of Children and Young People with Severe Cerebral Palsy
  - Lauren Caso (USA), African Percussion for Music Therapy
  - Esteban Roa (Colombia), The New Music Therapy Center of Panamá
  - Aleida Duarte (Panamá), Music for Social Change
- In 2018, VI Simposio, Performance Therapy:
  - Kathleen Howland (USA), Musical performance vs Therapy
  - Ana Maria Herrera (Colombia), Contributions of Music Therapy to the therapy of laughter
  - Talia Girton (USA), Elements of a Music Therapy Session
  - Andres Salgado (Colombia), Contributions of Music Therapy to the therapy of laughter
  - Carlos Gomez (Colombia), Community Music Therapy for the construction of peace in the armed conflict of Colombia
  - Colin Lee (Canada), Improvisation Workshop
  - Camila Pfeifer (Argentina), Music and the Brain
  - Violeta Diaz (Chile), Cases of Neurology in Music Therapy
  - CarylBeth Thomas (USA), Introduction to Music Therapy in Psychiatry
  - Jenny León (Colombia), Musicoterapia para el fortalecimiento de la dinámica familiar de niños con implante coclear
  - Camila Pfeifer (Argentina), Neurological music therapy
- In 2019 VII Simposio,
  - Talia Girton (USA), How to facilitate a circle of drums
  - Bibiana Rojas (Colombia), The music-therapy center of Panama
  - Dr. Mary Kauffman (USA), Choral singing in oncology: A pilot program
  - Andrés Salgado (Colombia), Basic aspects about the structure of a music therapy session, Music therapy in schools: an interdisciplinary strategy that contributes to the development of children, Music Therapy as a measure of symbolic reparation in victims of force displacement in Colombia
  - Talia Girton (USA), Practical Interventions and Composition, Music and relaxion
  - Cecilia Jurado (Ecuador), Strengthening the Practice: Principles of Cognitive Rehabilitation in Neurological Music Therapy (NMT), The connection between music therapy and songwriting
  - Esteban Roa (Colombia), Transcultural Music therapy, Music Therapy Self-Care Group for Parents of Preterm Infants in the Neonatal Intensive Care Unit
  - Violeta Díaz (Chile), Brain Plasticity and Music
  - Carine Ries (England), Music therapy and Yoga: A meeting of cultures
  - Leticia Castillo (USA), Benefits and applications of music therapy in autism
  - Bibiana Rojas and Diana Castillo (Colombia), Music therapy oriented to the elderly, Music therapy for inclusion
  - Cecilia Jurado (Ecuador), Musical interventions in disorders of consciousness
  - Luis Carlos Pérez (Panamá), The benefits of music therapy in patients with chronic disease pain
  - Patricia Zárate (Chile), Multicultural Music Theory with Indigenous Cultures
  - Meera Sinha (USA), Using voices to build community
- In 2020 VIII Simposio,
  - Kathleen Howland (USA), Music as emotional regulation, music as a tool for Resilience, music and relaxation
  - Rocio Moreno (El Salvador), A New Music: Practical Tools for Joint Harmonization
  - Walter Valverde (Panama), Neuroanatomy of Music: Miles, Coltrane, and Us
  - Sophie Maricq (Spain), Self-Care and Well-Being Workshop: Holistic Body and Mind Practice
  - Carine Ries (England), It's time to make music
  - Silvia Andreu (Chile), Music Therapy in Chile, Music Therapy for Socioemotional Learning at School
  - Jorge Montaldo (Argentina), Art-Health: Music and the Union of Forms, La Salud en Comunidad, La Musicoterapia, los Musicoterapeutas y sus Intervenciones
  - Violeta Díaz (Chile), Neurological Diseases and Music
  - Carine Ries (England), I still have my armor on
  - Karen Wacks (USA), Community Music Therapy, Mixing Interpretation with Therapy: Part I-II
  - Osvaldo Olivares (Chile), Brain Processing of Music
  - Esteban Roa (Colombia), Music Therapy with Neonates
  - Chelsea Brown (USA), Anxiety Reduction in Adults in Hospitals
- In 2021 IX Simposio,
  - Ciara Moser (Irland-Austria), Blind, So What?
  - Cecilia Di Prinzio (Argentina), Music Therapy and Management of Burnout In Teachers, Impact of the Latin American and Caribbean Network of Music Therapy for Early Childhood
  - Talia Girton (England), Music and Yoga for Early Childhood, Self-care for the Music Therapist
  - Ashley Herrera (Panama), Stimulation of Language and the Musical Brain in Children
  - Diana Castilla (Colombia), Music Therapy as a Means of Expression and Language Development
  - Bibiana Rojas (Colombia), Musical Experiences from Home
  - Carles Ries (England), Musical Mindfulness Online: Offering Support During COVID-19 Restrictions
  - Diego Alejandro Torres (Colombia), Music and Ritual: When Community Music Therapy Fades into Community Music
  - Violeta Diaz (Chile), Music and Neuroplasticity: A Paradigm Shift
  - Elkin Dario Franco (Colombia), Educational Music Therapy in the Context of an Arts School in Times of Confinement
  - Xingyu Yao (China), The Creative Aging Choir
  - Karin Biegun (Argentina), Sound Identities: Group Music Therapy for Migrant Pediatric Cancer Patients and their Families
  - Meera Sinha (USA), Vocal Improvisation for Resilience and Community
  - APAMU Panama music therapy society
  - Eugenia Hernandez-Ruiz, Coaching for Parents: Alternative in the World of Virtual Music Therapy
  - Graciela "Chelín" Núñez (Panamá), Relaxation and breathing, Relaxation with natural sounds
  - Beyond La Bamba: The Latin American Music Therapy Network
  - Suzanne Hanser (USA), Musical Interventions During the Era of COVID-19
  - Juan Carlos Camarena (Mexico), The Humanistic Music Therapy Model: Foundations, Contributions and Applications
  - Adriana Isabel Franco Jiménez (Colombia), Music therapy and traditional medicine from China
  - Sharon Katz (South Africa), "When Voices Meet" Documentary, Interview with Sharon Katz
  - Patricia Zárate (Chile), Music and Global Community in Crisis
  - Graciela Broqua (Argentina), Alternative-Augmentative Communication in Music Therapy Telecare
  - Cindybet Perez-Martinez (Puerto Rico), Medical Music Therapy in the Midst of the Pandemic: The Experience of Puerto Rico
  - Carolina Muñoz (Chile), Music Therapy in the Context of Social Outburst, Pandemic and New Constitution in Chile
  - David Gamella (Spain), Music Therapy in Times of COVID-19: Therapeutic Skills and Technological Resources
  - Yenny Rocio León Ochoa (Colombia), Music Therapy for Strengthening the Emotional Bond between Children with Cochlear Implants
- In 2022 X Simposio
  - Mariane Oselame (Brasil), Music therapy and health promotion; Music therapy as care practice mental health
  - Ricardo Maya (Chile), Family Music Therapy for the humanization of the Intensive Care
  - Diana Castillo (Colombia), Music therapy in the personal development and self discovery
  - Dr. Walter Valverde, COVID-19's sounds
  - Bibiana Rojas (Colombia), Composition in Special Music Education
  - Patricia Zárate Pérez (USA), Introduction to the Master in Global Music Therapy
  - Melanie Taylor (Panamá), 10 Musical activities to perform online and face-to-face for musician therapists, teachers and facilitators
  - Diana Soto (Colombia), Music Therapy in the accompaniment of Autism
  - Violeta Diaz (Chile), Case Studies in the Music therapy Neurological
  - Management models such as strategy for the defense and reconnaissance music professional therapy in Panama: Challenges and Opportunities, Vilma Esquivel (APAMU)
  - Eugenia Hernandez-Ruiz (USA), X SLMT Experiences of research inside of courses of the licensed at music therapy: a tool for Development of Clinical Thinking
  - Elkin Darío Franco Montoya (Colombia), Global Questions, Local Responses: Reflections of music therapy pediatric and stimulation neurological in Context
  - Kathleen Howland (USA), Looking up at future of the interventions based on music
  - Marta Hernandez (Puerto Rico), The Kind of Music Therapy with Suzuki Method with the children population
- In 2023 XI Simposio
  - Ana Maria Rodriguez Barreto (Colombia), Experience of Community Music Therapy in Youth in Conflict with the Law; Community Music therapy in Women with a Pregnancy in Conflict in Covid Times
  - Elkin Dario Franco (Colombia), Music therapy from the Emergency Service
  - Carine Ries (England), Music therapy and Imaging Therapy as a Treatment Approach to Depression and Anxiety
  - Latin American Music Therapy Network (LAMTN), Music therapy and Decolonization
  - Graciela Broqua (Argentina), Accessibility to Vocal Expression with and without Assygitive Technology
  - Natalia Quintana (Chile), Welfare Programme for Musicians
  - Rodrigo Hernández (Chile), Joint care: Collaboration, Music therapy and Physical Rehabilitation
  - Andrés Salgado (Colombia) - Ana Maria Rodriguez Barreto (Colombia), Community Music therapy in Women with a Pregnancy in Conflict in Covid Times
  - Maria del Señor Marchante (Spain), The Power of Music in Functional Diversity
  - Diana Castillo (Colombia), Music therapy and Autism
  - Ekaterina Zúñiga (Panama), It's Time to Play. The Importance of Game in Musicotherapy
  - Vilma Esquivel (Panama), Branding as Strategy to Reset Funds in Health Environments
  - Walter Valverde (Panama), Music and Brain: Where Science and Arts are Unseated
- In 2024 XII Simposio
  - Sara Gonzalez Tejera (Spain), Healing & Personal Development: Through Singing and Voice
  - Cateri Muro (Venezuela), Music as Territory: An Ethno-Health Approach in Music Therapy
  - Freddy Madriaza (Chile), Musical Sound Imagery
  - Natalia Quintana (Chile), Music and Universal Accessibility for Creating a Fairer World
  - Flor Vazquez (Argentina), Improvisation: The Percussion System with Signs - Part I
  - María Juliana Plazas Coronado (Colombia) • Miryam Cristina Fernández (Colombia) • María del Mar Dulce Guzmán (Colombia) • Daniela Sepúlveda Alarcón (Colombia) • Camilo Andrés Marroquín Díaz (Colombia), Effects of Music Therapy: Emotional Well-being in Children with Cancer
  - Ekaterina Zúñiga (Panama), The Use of Voice and Language: Cultural Identity through Music Therapy
  - Natalia Guerra (Ecuador), Symbolism, Empowerment and Expression: Female Choral Singing
  - Nuria Marsimian (Argentina), Functional Musical Profile: Evaluation Tool for the Autism Spectrum
  - Rodrigo Hernández, Music Therapy in Rehabilitation
  - Daniel Torres Ariaza (Mexico), Psychosocial Music Therapy in Migrant Population: Tijuana, Mexico
  - Graciela Broqua (Argentina), Accessibility to Instrument Playing
  - Lorena Buenseñor (Uruguay), Music Therapy and Pain - Part II
  - Samuel Gracida (Germany), Crossed Harmonies: Interculturality, Multiculturalism, and Transculturalism in Music Therapy
  - Azul Miguens (Argentina) • Luciana Parodi (Argentina) • Karina Ferrari (Argentina), First Song: An Approach in Obstetric Patients
  - Maria Leticia Alberti (Argentina), Musical Memory & Rehabilitation Strategies - Patients with Verbal Memory Deficit
  - Paola Karina Lazo (England/Argentina), Social Entrepreneurship in Music Therapy for Early Childhood
  - Vilma Esquivel (Panama) • Patricia Zárate Pérez (Chile/USA/Panama) • Asociación Panameña de Musicoterapia, APAMU (Panama), Panamanian Music Therapy Association - APAMU
  - Lorena Buenseñor (Uruguay) • Flor Vazquez (Argentina) • Patricia Zárate Pérez (Chile/USA/Panama) • Comité LatinoAmericano de Musicoterapia, CLAM (Global), Latin American Music Therapy Committee, CLAM
  - Rocio Moreno (El Salvador), Development of Music Therapy in Central America: History, Projections, Challenges
  - Elkin Dario Franco (Colombia), Music Therapy Experiences that Transform Hospital, Social, and Educational Contexts
  - Eugenia Hernandez-Ruiz (Mexico), The Practice of Music Therapy in Mexico: Initial Portrait, Challenges, Hopes
  - Flor Vazquez (Argentina), Improvisation: The Percussion System with Signs - Part II
  - Graciela Broqua (Argentina), Postgraduate Degrees in Music Therapy in Spanish at a Distance
  - Guilherme Machado (Brazil), Inclusive Minds: Music and Autism

== Awards and honors ==
- Pianist Luis Russell in 2003: Consider one of the most important figures in the jazz history. Musical Director for Louis Armstrong's band since 1935. Pianist Luis Russell led one of the early big bands. In 1925, he moved from New Orleans to Chicago to join Doc Cook's Orchestra and then became the pianist in King Oliver's band. When he was 17, he moved to Colon to create a band with his music. Later, he moved to New Orleans when he formed his own quartet and he met Louis Armstrong
- Pianist Victor Boa in 2005: He was part of the Panamanian jazz scene beginning in the late forties. His particular flavor of jazz was called "Tambo jazz". Victor Boa was born Victor Everton McRae in 1925 in “El Vaticano” a popular sector in the El Chorrrillo section of Panama City. He learned to master the keyboard quickly at age fifteen and from there he was practically self-taught. Soon he became part of the blossoming jazz scene of Panama in the late 1940s. Throughout his life, he was variously known as “The High Priest of Jazz,” “The Master of the Key Board,” and “Electric Man.”
- Multi-instrumentalist Mauricio Smith in 2006: Mauricio Smith was born in Panama but lived most of his life in New York City. He performed and recorded with Clark Terry, Charlie Mingus, Dizzy Gillespie, Chubby Checker, Eartha Kitt, and Harry Belafonte. Smith was a member of the Saturday Night Live band and led the Latin band at the Rainbow Room for six years. He scored music for movies and wrote arrangements for Tito Puente. He has performed classical music as a flautist and soloist with the Puerto Rican Symphony and has given recitals at Avery Fisher Hall. Smith was born on 11 July 1931 in Colón, Panamá. He distinguished himself as a cyclist while he played flute in La Banda Republicana de Panamá. He attended the Conservatory of Music of Panamá and performed professionally with la Banda de Bomberos de Colón. He soon focused on folkloric Panamanian music with Leonidas Cajar. Apart from the flute, he was known to play saxophone, clarinet, piccolo, harmonica, classical guitar, bass, vibraphone, and Latin percussion.
- Singer Barbara Wilson in 2007: Barbara Wilson most well known as "La Dama del Jazz" was born in 1940 in Panama. Since she was a child, she always shared her love for music and she won a lot of singer competitions that confirmed her big talent. With her family support, she conquered big stages in Panama. She started to be known in television for Blanquita Amaro's show in Tlevisora Nacional Canal 2. She worked with artist like Mocedades, Danny Rivera, Olga Guillot, Celia Cruz, etc. In 1977 and 1978 she was awarded with the Buho de Oro.
- In 2008 the honorees were all the festival supporters due to their 5th anniversary
- Bassist, composer and arranger Clarence Martin Sr. in 2009: Contributed to Panamanian jazz since the 1940s and has influenced several generations of musicians from many genres such as jazz, classical, and Caribbean music. Born in Ciudad Panamá on 29 January 1922. His mother was pianist Clementine Armtrading de Martin. His father, Vernon Martin, was a clarinetist and played in La Banda Del Cuerpo de Bomberos de Panamá. Since his childhood, Martin accompanied his mother on saxophone and piano. He became a bassist and arranger for Armando Boza. Martin toured internationally with Celia Cruz, Beny Moré, Cascarita, Vicentico Valdez, Miguelito Valdez, Sara Montiel, Angélica María, Roberto Ledezma, Peter Dutchin, Daniel Santos, Lucho Gatica, Olga Guillot, Don Pedro Vargas, Mona Bell, and Shaw Elliot.
- Pianist Sony White in 2010: Born in Panama, White lived in the U.S. most of his life and recorded "Strange Fruit" with Billie Holiday. He also performed with Sidney Bechet, Artie Shaw, Benny Carter, and Dexter Gordon. The success of the song propelled White to continue working with Artie Shaw and Benny Carter. After World War II, White explored R&B and contemporary pop music which led him to play with Big Joe Turner, Lawrence Lucie, Sid Catlett, and Roy Eldridge.
- Trumpeter Víctor Vitín Paz in 2011: Considered by many to be the greatest lead trumpeter player of the modern area. A Latin jazz trumpeter, he was a member of the Fania All Stars. He worked for Broadway shows in New York City and performed with Ella Fitzgerald, Frank Sinatra, Dizzy Gillespie, and The Jackson Five. He worked with Eddie Palmieri, Celia Cruz, Tito Puente, Machito, etc. But he also performed with pop and jazz icons like Frank Sinatra, Julio Iglesias, Sammy Davis, etc.
- Saxophonist, composer and arranger Carlos Garnett in 2012: Born in Red Tank, Panama Canal Zone. As a teenager he played with soldiers from the nearby United States Army base. Garnett started playing tenor in 1957 and calypso and Latin music. In 1962, he moved to New York, working with rock bands, but he listened to free-jazz saxophonists. He gained recognition for his work with Freddie Hubbard, Art Blakey's Jazz Messengers, and Charles Mingus, and Miles Davis. He also worked with Jack McDuff, Andrew Hill, Gary Bartz, and Norman Connors. He recorded five albums for Muse between 1974 and 1977.
- In 2013 the honorees were all the festival supporters due to their 10th anniversary
- Saxophonist Eric Dolphy in 2015: An American free jazz alto saxophonist, flautist, and bass clarinetist, whose parents immigrated from Panama. He collaborated Charles Mingus, John Coltrane, and Booker Little. On a few occasions, he also played the clarinet and piccolo. Dolphy was one of several multi-instrumentalists to gain prominence in the same era. His use of the bass clarinet helped to establish the instrument within jazz. Dolphy extended the vocabulary and boundaries of the alto saxophone, and was among the earliest significant jazz flute soloists.
- Pianist and Composer Randy Weston in 2016: American jazz pianist and composer, his father was Panamanian. Weston's music incorporated African elements. He collaborated with Dizzy Gillespie, Kenny Dorham, and Cecil Payne Weston began working professionally in R&B bands in the late 1940s before playing in the bebop outfits of Payne and Kenny Dorham. After singing with Riverside in 1954, he led trios and quartets and attained a reputation as a composer, contributing "Hi-Fly" and "Little Niles" to the repertoire.
- Vocalist Violeta Green in 2017: A native of Bocas del Toro, Cobra lived and worked throughout his life in the province of Colon and both Violeta and Cobra. Violeta gave to jazz in Panama its own hue. This has been documented properly in many hours of television tapes, as well as in an excellent work of investigation made by Gerardo Maloney, entitled “Tambo Jazz,” also made into an audio-visual production with the same title in the decade of years 90s.
- In 2018 the honorees were all the festival supporters due to their 15th anniversary
- Trombonist Alex Blake in 2019: Born 4 April 1926, in Panama City. He grew up on 20th street and Central Avenue, a half a block from the Teatro Presidente. He attended Gil Colunje Private Catholic School as a child and young man. He is one of the very last musicians still alive to come out of Panama's golden musical era of the 1940s and 50s.
- Double bassist Reggie Johnson in 2020: Born in Owensboro, Kentucky, in 1940, Reginald Volney Johnson started out as a trombonist, first playing with school orchestras and later in army bands. In 1961 Reggie switched to string bass, and started working with avant-garde musicians such as Bill Barron and Archie Shepp (recorded with Shepp the famous album "Fire Music").
- Singer and saxophonist Enid and Gene Jefferson in 2021: Enid Lowe, also known as "the Sarah Vaughan of Panama" was born in Colon, Panama in 1935 and from an early age sung in various Panamanian venues with important musicians such as Clarence Martin. Lowe relocated to New York many years ago and remains an active performer in the jazz scene to this day. Gene Jefferson, born in 1931 in Panama City, also relocated to New York City and over the years performed with prominent artists such as Tito Rodriguez, Ray Charles, Arsenio Rodriguez, among others. Lowe and Jefferson who are New York mainstays are part of the Panamanian music community (Mauricio Smith, Frank Anderson, Vitin Paz, among many others).
- Pianist Frank Andersson in 2022: Born in 1929 in Bocas del Toro, of Panamanian parents and Jamaican grandparents. Made its professional debut in 1943, in that time he was also a pianist accompanist of the singer Enid Lowe at the Rex Archibold Show on radio CRP in Colón.
- In 2023 the honorees were all the festival supporters due to their 20th anniversary
- Drummer Billy Cobham in 2024: After graduating high school, Billy Cobham served as a percussionist in the U.S. Army National Band. He then played with pianist Horace Silver's band, touring the U.S. in the late 1960s. Cobham joined Miles Davis' fusion ensemble, contributing to classics like 'Like-Evil' and 'A Tribute to Jack Johnson'. He later worked with the Mahavishnu Orchestra, furthering his fusion style. Cobham formed his own band, Spectrum, with a debut album mixing jazz, funk, and rock. Named one of the 25 Most Influential Drummers by Modern Drummer magazine in 2001, Cobham now teaches drums online and continues to tour worldwide, celebrating his extensive career.
