= Abbey Sings Abbey =

Studio album by Abbey Lincoln
- Released: 2007
- Recorded: September 25–27, 2006; November 17, 2006
- Studio: Avatar (New York, New York)
- Genre: Jazz
- Length: 59:38
- Label: Verve; 0602498470305
- Producer: Jean-Philippe Allard, Jay Newland

Abbey Lincoln chronology
It's Me (2003)	Abbey Sings Abbey (2007)	Sophisticated Abbey: Live at the Keystone Korner (2015)

Abbey Sings Abbey is an album by jazz vocalist Abbey Lincoln. It was recorded during September and November, 2006, at Avatar Studios in New York City; these dates were Lincoln's final recording sessions. The album, which was released in 2007 by Verve Records, features a rendition of Thelonious Monk's "Blue Monk", with lyrics by Lincoln, followed by eleven original compositions, all of which were previously recorded in different contexts. Lincoln is accompanied by accordion player Gil Goldstein, who also provided the arrangements, guitarist and mandolin player Larry Campbell, cellist Dave Eggar, double bassist Scott Colley, and drummer Shawn Pelton.

== Reception ==
Professional ratings
Review scores
Source	Rating
All About Jazz	4.5/5 stars
AllMusic	4.5/5 stars
The Guardian	3/5 stars

Nate Chinen of The New York Times described Lincoln as "the rare jazz singer who writes her own songs, and the rare jazz songwriter whose music conveys the lessons of her life," and called the album "a study in gravity and wisdom," one that "captures the depth of her art with majestic serenity and bittersweet clarity."

In a review for AllMusic, Matt Collar wrote: "This is a beautifully raw and intimate album full of lament and the faint perfume of romance... These are enigmatic torch songs and playful blues, dark elegies and poignant ballads all featuring Lincoln's own devastatingly precise lyrics and melodies that hint at not just death and regret, but also a lingering passion for life."

The Guardian's John Fordham commented: "The finale 'Being Me' ('Hold the curtain open, it's time to take a bow') suggests a slightly self-conscious rolling of the credits, but the singer's old contention, 'I live through music and it lives through me,' still sounds like the truth."

Suzanne Lorge of All About Jazz called the album "a stunning collection of some of the singer's most memorable works," and stated: "Lincoln is a writer of some depth and the eleven original tunes... offer strong testament to her poetic talents... Her raspy alto with its unhurried bends and shifts probes the nether reaches of the music in the manner of her artistic forebear Billie Holiday, but the album's feel is definitely contemporary."

A writer for No Depression described the album as "a master class in phrasing," and remarked: "Lincoln's voice remains as beguiling and insistent as ever... few singers could even approach Lincoln's tricky vocal counterpoint — words stretched and clipped, yet always lovingly bound to the song's angular contours."

Writing for Jazz Chicago, Brad Walseth noted: "Abbey Sings Abbey is a testament to the singer's lyricism and ability to bring her life experiences to bear in her delivery, wrought by 77 years of life, love and loss... The maturity and perception here is striking and the overall mood is one of melancholy, reconciliation and somewhat bemused acceptance of fate... A culmination of a great career, Abbey Sings Abbey is a singular event and perhaps, Lincoln's best album."

== Track listing ==
"Blue Monk" was composed by Thelonious Monk, with lyrics by Abbey Lincoln. Remaining tracks were composed by Abbey Lincoln.

1. "Blue Monk" – 5:14
2. "Throw It Away" – 5:19
3. "And It's Supposed to Be Love" – 4:47
4. "Should've Been" – 5:28
5. "The World is Falling Down" – 3:41
6. "Bird Alone" – 4:57
7. "Down Here Below" – 6:33
8. "The Music is the Magic" – 3:54
9. "Learning How to Listen" – 4:37
10. "The Merry Dancer" – 6:30
11. "Love Has Gone Away" – 4:41
12. "Being Me" – 3:55

== Personnel ==
- Jean-Philippe Allard – Co-Producer
- Jay Newland – Co-Producer, Recording Engineer, Mixer
- Abbey Lincoln – vocals
- Gil Goldstein – accordion
- Larry Campbell – acoustic guitar, electric guitar, resonator guitar, steel guitar, mandolin
- Dave Eggar – cello
- Scott Colley – double bass
- Shawn Pelton – drums
