= Uriel Herman =

Israeli musical artist

Uriel Ze’ev Herman אוריאל הרמן
- Born: 13 April 1987 (age 39); Jerusalem, Israel
- Genres: Jazz
- Occupations: Musician, Composer
- Instrument: Piano
- Years active: 2008-present
- Website: Uriel Herman

Uriel Herman (Hebrew: אוריאל הרמן; born April 13, 1987) is an Israeli jazz artist and classical pianist and founding member of The Uriel Herman Quartet.

== Biography ==
Herman begin learning piano from age 7, graduating from the Israeli Arts and Science Academy in 2005. He later graduated from the Jerusalem Academy of Music and Dance in 2010, having studied composition under Prof. Andre Hajdu and Prof. Michael Wolpe, and piano with Ilana Vered and Prof. Assaf Zohar.

His first album, Half Colours, Half voices was released in collaboration with double-bassist Ehud Ettun, consisting of compositions based on poems by poet Rachel Bluwstein. It was listed by Haaretz as one of the top 15 Israeli albums for that year. In 2014, he released the album Awake, which directly led to the creation of his ensemble The Uriel Herman Quartet and was nominated in the top 5 jazz albums of the year by NRG.

Following the release of Awake, Herman appeared at the Red Sea Jazz Festival and was invited to perform at the opening of National Taichung Theater. This kickstarted Uriel’s international career, playing in venues like The Forbidden City Concert Hall, Pingtung Performing Art Center and festivals like Nuits du Sud, Amersfoort Jazz festival, Jazzmelie Thuringen and Eclats d’Email Jazz among others.

He is currently an affiliated artist with Label Laborie Jazz, with whom he released his latest album Face to Face.

== Composer ==
=== Orchestral ===
In 2017, Herman composed White Night: a rhapsody for Jazz Quartet and Orchestra which was premiered and recorded with the Netanya Kibbutz Orchestra. Performances – Tai-chung, Sous les Pommiers, Stanford, SSK (solo), Jarasum. In 2019, Herman collaborated with Jenaer Philharmonic Orchestra, to write three pieces for the Orchestra and his quartet.

=== Soundtrack Composition ===
Herman composed the original soundtrack for the 2018 Polish documentary Standby Painter (2018), about a man who stole a painting from a museum by replacing it with a replica.

== Discography ==
Album	Songs
Face to Face	The Man Who Sold The World; Ballad for Yael; Shva Esre "I shall not die, but live" Winter light Hour of the wolf Shirat hachalil
Awake	Walking; Smells like teen spirit כשאצטרך (Because i have to); White Night; Lucky מכתבי אהבה (Love letters); Because I have to
Half Colours, Half Voice	Ko Tzipiti; Zemer; Osher Shalev; Hine Ekach; Akara; Metay; Bibdiduti Hagdola; Balayla; Yonatan; Avir Psagot; Hatzdek Et Hadin; Veulay

== Filmography ==
Movie	Tracklist
White Night Rhapsody for Jazz Quartet and Orchestra	part I – “Gathering” part II – First Glass “Sundawn” part III – “Passage” part IV – Second Glass “Trees Revive” part V – “Polydance” part VI – Third Glass “Glowing” part VII – “East Calls” part VIII – “Defuse”
Windmill Sessions	Winter Light; Hour of the wolf The Silence

== Tours ==
Herman has completed many international and national tours, including Israel, Taiwan, China, France, Czech Republic, Netherlands, Germany, Cyprus, USA, Romania, Argentina, South Korea, Denmark, and Austria.
