= That's Him! =

Studio album by Abbey Lincoln with the Riverside Jazz Stars
- Released: 1958
- Recorded: October 28, 1957
- Studios: Reeves Sound Studios, New York City
- Genre: Jazz
- Length: 48:48
- Labels: Riverside; RLP 12-251
- Producers: Bill Grauer and Orrin Keepnews

Abbey Lincoln chronology
Abbey Lincoln's Affair (1957)	That's Him! (1958)	It's Magic (1958)

That's Him! is the second album by American jazz vocalist Abbey Lincoln featuring tracks recorded in 1957 for the Riverside label.

== Reception ==
Professional ratings
Review scores
Source	Rating
AllMusic	4/5 stars
MusicHound Jazz	3.5/5 stars
The Penguin Guide to Jazz Recordings	2.5/4 stars
The Rolling Stone Jazz & Blues Album Guide	3.5/5 stars
The Virgin Encyclopedia of Jazz	4/5 stars

The editors of AllMusic awarded the album 4 stars, and reviewer Scott Yanow stated: "even this early, she was already a major jazz singer with a style of her own".

A reviewer for Billboard commented: "Miss Lincoln is a comer with a flare for the dramatic and an effective delivery... Material treated is provocative; some of it off-beat, some in the standard category."

Eric Ajaye of the Australian Broadcasting Corporation noted that the album "marked the beginnings of a real change in the singer's style," and remarked: "While her debut was a flowery orchestral session featuring a big band with strings, this sophomore date pitted Abbey's expressive voice against some of New York's leading voices... Here, we get our first glimpse of a revitalised Abbey Lincoln, and both she and Roach would take this incandescent energy into the next decade with music made in response to the civil rights movement."

The authors of The Penguin Guide to Jazz Recordings wrote: "Dorham is one of the most naturally vocal of the bop trumpeters and as such is an ideal partner, though it's the still underrated Kelly who carries the day."

== Track listing ==
1. "Strong Man" (Oscar Brown, Jr.) – 5:04
2. "Happiness Is a Thing Called Joe" (Harold Arlen, E.Y. "Yip" Harburg) – 5:57
3. "My Man" (Jacques Charles, Channing Pollack, Albert Willemetz, Maurice Yvain) – 3:57
4. "Tender as a Rose" (Phil Moore) – 3:00
5. "That's Him" (Ogden Nash, Kurt Weill) – 3:26
6. "I Must Have That Man!" (Dorothy Fields, Jimmy McHugh) – 4:00
7. "I Must Have That Man!" [take 3] (Fields, McHugh) – 3:56 Bonus track on CD reissue
8. "Porgy" (Dorothy Fields, Jimmy McHugh) – 4:27
9. "Porgy" [take 1] (Dorothy Fields, Jimmy McHugh) – 4:30 Bonus track on CD reissue
10. "When a Woman Loves a Man" (Bernie Hanighen, Gordon Jenkins, Johnny Mercer) – 4:28
11. "Don't Explain" (Arthur Herzog, Jr., Billie Holiday) – 6:39

== Personnel ==
- Kenny Dorham – trumpet
- Sonny Rollins – tenor saxophone
- Wynton Kelly – piano (except track 11: "Don't Explain"), bass (track 11)
- Paul Chambers – bass (except track 11)
- Max Roach – drums

None of the above musicians play on track 4, which is a solo voice performance from Ms. Lincoln
