= Bob Russell (songwriter) =

American lyricist, songwriter (1914–1970)

Bob Russell (born Sidney Keith Rosenthal; April 25, 1914 – February 18, 1970) was an American songwriter (mainly lyricist) born in Passaic, New Jersey.

== Career ==
Russell attended Washington University in St. Louis, Missouri. He worked as an advertising copywriter in New York; for a time, his roommate there was Sidney Sheldon, later a novelist. He turned to writing material for vaudeville acts, and then for film studios, ultimately writing complete scores for two movies: Jack and the Beanstalk and Reach for Glory. The latter film received the Locarno International Film Festival prize in 1962. A number of other movies featured compositions by Russell, including Affair in Trinidad (1952), Blue Gardenia (1953), The Girl Can't Help It (1956), The Girl Most Likely (1957), A Matter of WHO (1961), Abbott and Costello Meet Captain Kidd (1952), Sound Off (1952), That Midnight Kiss (1949), and A Ticket to Tomahawk (1950). In the movies The Girl Most Likely, Blue Gardenia and Matter of WHO, Russell's compositions included the title songs.

In 1968, Russell along with songwriting partner Quincy Jones was nominated for an Academy Award in the Best Original Song category ("The Eyes of Love" for the film Banning). The following year, he and Jones were again nominated in the same category (the title song for the Sidney Poitier film For Love of Ivy).

He had his last hit song in 1969–70 with "He Ain't Heavy, He's My Brother", co-written with Bobby Scott and recorded by The Hollies. The song was introduced to the group by Russell's son-in-law Jefferey Spearitt, who was living in London at the time with his wife Simohn.

Among Russell's collaborators were Louis Alter, Peter De Rose, Duke Ellington, Bronislaw Kaper, Lester Lee, Carl Sigman, Harold Spina, and Harry Warren.

== Hall of fame ==
In 1970, he was inducted into the Songwriters Hall of Fame. In 2004, he was posthumously awarded the American Society of Composers, Authors and Publishers lifetime achievement award in the pop category. The award's presenter, songwriter Marilyn Bergman, called Russell a "mentor and dear, dear friend", without whom she "never would have become a songwriter".

== Personal life and death ==
Russell died in 1970 from lymphoma in Beverly Hills at the age of 55.

== Published songs ==
=== Lyricist ===
- "Babalu" (music by written by Margarita Lecuona)
- "Ballerina" (music by Carl Sigman)
- "Brazil" (wrote English language lyric to music by Ary Barroso)
- "Carnival" (music by Harry Warren)
- "Circus" (music by Louis Alter)
- "Crazy He Calls Me" (music by Carl Sigman)
- "Do Nothin' Till You Hear From Me" (music by Duke Ellington)
- "Don't Get Around Much Anymore" (music by Duke Ellington)
- "Frenesi" (Music by Alberto Domínguez, lyrics by Dominguez and Charles Carpenter as well as Russell)
- "He Ain't Heavy, He's My Brother" (music by Bobby Scott)
- "I Didn't Know About You" (music by Duke Ellington)
- "I Know, I Know, I Know" (music by Bronislaw Kaper)
- "Interlude" (music by Pete Rugolo)
- "Like Love" (music by Duke Ellington)
- "Maria Elena" (music by Lorenzo Barcelata)
- "Misirlou" (collaboration with Fred Wise and Milton Leeds on English language lyric)
- "No More" (with Tutti Camarata)
- "No Other Love" (music by Paul Weston after Frédéric Chopin)
- "Once" (1962 with Joanie Sommers and Bobby Troup Sextet) (music by Harold Spina)
- "Taboo" (wrote English language lyric to music by Margarita Lecuona)
- "The Next Train Out" (music by Lincoln Mayorga)
- "Temporary Jones" (music by Robert Lamm)
- "Time Was" (English lyric for "Duerme", music by Miguel Prado, original Spanish lyric by Gabriel Luna de la Fuente)
- "(Why Have a Falling Out) Just When We're Falling in Love" (adaptation of "Robbin's Nest" by Illinois Jacquet and Sir Charles Thompson)
- "Would I Love You (Love You, Love You)" (music by Harold Spina)
- "You Came a Long Way from St. Louis" (music by John Benson Brooks)

=== Composer ===
- "Busy as a Bee" (in collaboration with Joseph Meyer and Carl Sigman)
- "Concerto for Cootie" (in collaboration with Duke Ellington)
- "I'm Winging Home" (in collaboration with Harry Tobias)
- "The Color of Love" (with Bronislaw Kaper)
- "You Go Your Way (and I'll Go Crazy)" (with lyricist Lincoln Mayorga)
