= You Gotta Pay the Band =

1991 studio album by Abbey Lincoln

Studio album by Abbey Lincoln
- Released: 1991
- Recorded: February 25–26, 1991
- Studio: BMG Recording Studios, New York City
- Genre: Jazz
- Length: 57:56
- Label: Verve, Gitanes Jazz; 511 110-2
- Producer: Jean-Philippe Allard

Abbey Lincoln chronology
The World Is Falling Down (1990)	You Gotta Pay the Band (1991)	Devil's Got Your Tongue (1992)

You Gotta Pay the Band is an album by jazz vocalist Abbey Lincoln. It was recorded on February 25 and 26, 1991, at BMG Recording Studios in New York City, and was released later that year by Verve Records and Gitanes Jazz Productions. On the album, Lincoln is joined by saxophonist Stan Getz (in one of his last recording sessions), pianist Hank Jones, double bassist Charlie Haden, and drummer Mark Johnson. Video clips from the recording sessions were used in the documentary film You Gotta Pay The Band.

== Reception ==
Professional ratings
Review scores
Source	Rating
AllMusic	4/5 stars
MusicHound Jazz	5/5 stars
The Penguin Guide to Jazz	3.5/4 stars
The Rolling Stone Jazz & Blues Album Guide	4/5 stars
The Virgin Encyclopedia of Jazz	3/5 stars

You Gotta Pay the Band was nominated for Best Jazz Vocal Performance at the 35th Annual Grammy Awards.

In a review for AllMusic, Scott Yanow called the album "excellent", and wrote: "Getz's cool tenor fits in very well with Lincoln's voice, making one wish that they had met up previously... it is not surprising that Lincoln sounds typically inspired... Recommended."

The authors of The Penguin Guide to Jazz Recordings stated: "With the sole exception of 'Bird Alone', which is a dud, the material is excellent, and it's the sort of band singers will die for." They also praised drummer Johnson, describing him as "an elegant and subtle performer who knows where to place an accent and how to weight it."

Writer Loren Schoenberg commented: "Lincoln has never needed anything but the words of the song she is singing to get her point across... [she] is a superb actress who portrays the complete range of emotions and associations suggested by the song she is singing."

== Track listing ==
1. "Bird Alone" (Abbey Lincoln) – 8:34
2. "I'm in Love" (Joan Griffin) – 6:13
3. "You Gotta Pay the Band" (Abbey Lincoln) – 4:50
4. "Brother, Can You Spare a Dime?" (Jay Gorney, Yip Harburg) – 6:51
5. "You Made Me Funny" (Abbey Lincoln) – 3:02
6. "And How I Hoped for Your Love" (R.B. Lynch, Abbey Lincoln) – 3:39
7. "When I'm Called Home" (Abbey Lincoln) – 5:27
8. "Summer Wishes, Winter Dreams" (Johnny Mandel, Alan and Marilyn Bergman) – 6:29
9. "Up Jumped Spring" (Freddie Hubbard, Abbey Lincoln) – 4:41
10. "A Time for Love" (Johnny Mandel, Paul Francis Webster) – 8:39

== Personnel ==
- Abbey Lincoln – vocals
- Stan Getz – tenor saxophone
- Hank Jones – piano
- Charlie Haden – bass
- Mark Johnson – drums
- Maxine Roach – viola (tracks 1 and 10)
