= Who Used to Dance =

Studio album by Abbey Lincoln
- Released: 1997
- Recorded: April and May 1996
- Studio: Clinton Recording Studios, New York City
- Genre: Jazz
- Length: 1:01:05
- Label: Verve, Gitanes Jazz; 533 559-2
- Producer: Jean-Philippe Allard

Abbey Lincoln chronology
A Turtle's Dream (1995)	Who Used to Dance (1997)	Wholly Earth (1999)

Who Used to Dance is an album by jazz vocalist Abbey Lincoln. It was recorded during April and May, 1996, at Clinton Recording Studios in New York City, and was released in 1997 by Verve Records and Gitanes Jazz Productions. On the album, Lincoln is joined by a core group of pianist Marc Cary, double bassist Michael Bowie, and drummer Aaron Walker, as well as saxophonists Riley T. Bandy III, Steve Coleman, Oliver Lake, Frank Morgan, Justin Robinson, and Julien Lourau, cornetist Graham Haynes, pianist Rodney Kendrick, double bassist John Ormond, drummers Alvester Garnett and Taru Alexander, vocalists Arthur Green and Bazzi Bartholomew Gray, and tap dancer Savion Glover.

== Reception ==
Professional ratings
Review scores
Source	Rating
AllMusic	3/5 stars
MusicHound Jazz	4/5 stars
The Penguin Guide to Jazz	3.5/4 stars
The Rolling Stone Jazz & Blues Album Guide	3/5 stars
The Virgin Encyclopedia of Jazz	4/5 stars

In a review for AllMusic, Scott Yanow called the album "an interesting but not overly essential outing," and wrote: "Lincoln... still had a reasonably strong voice at this point in her career, and although she showed signs of mellowing now and then, she was still capable of performing fiery musical statements."

The authors of The Penguin Guide to Jazz Recordings singled out the title track for praise, stating that it is "intriguing in that it features tap-dancer Savion Glover, a young man in the great tradition of jazz hoofers, but with moves all his own; don't dismiss the concept out of hand - it works."

Billboard's Jim Macnie included the album in his top 10 releases of 1997, and commented: "She's got the whole world in her head, and its frayed condition troubles her. She's also got art in her heart, so her worries never fail to compel."

Jim Santella of All About Jazz remarked: "the singer maintains her own distinctive manner of delivering a lyric. Seven of the nine tracks... are ballads that serve to demonstrate the graininess in Lincoln's voice, the long, tied-together whole note phrases, and the carefully articulated words... Recommended."

A writer for the Hartford Courant wrote: "Lincoln... has a mesmerizing voice — one of the most seductive sounds in jazz or pop. At the same time, she delivers a tune with a theatrical skill far surpassing many highly acclaimed cabaret singers... [she] is given regal backing throughout."

== Track listing ==
1. "Love Has Gone Away" (Abbey Lincoln) – 7:36
2. "Who Used to Dance" (Abbey Lincoln) – 9:40
3. "Love Lament" (Richard Berry Lynch) – 7:11
4. "Mr. Tambourine Man" (Bob Dylan) – 6:53
5. "When Autumn Sings" (Richard Berry Lynch) – 4:08
6. "Love What You Doin' Down There" (Abbey Lincoln) – 8:25
7. "Street of Dreams" (Victor Young, Sam M. Lewis) – 6:33
8. "I Sing a Song" (Abbey Lincoln) – 5:48
9. "The River" (Abbey Lincoln) – 4:59

== Personnel ==
- Abbey Lincoln – vocals
- Riley T. Bandy III – alto saxophone (tracks 6, 8)
- Steve Coleman – alto saxophone (tracks 1, 6, 7)
- Oliver Lake – alto saxophone (tracks 6, 9)
- Frank Morgan – alto saxophone (tracks 3, 5)
- Justin Robinson – alto saxophone (track 9)
- Julien Lourau – tenor saxophone (track 4)
- Graham Haynes – cornet (track 9)
- Marc Cary – piano (tracks 1–8)
- Rodney Kendrick – piano (track 9)
- Michael Bowie – double bass (tracks 1–8)
- John Ormond – double bass (track 9)
- Aaron Walker – drums, percussion (tracks 1, 2, 4, 7, 8)
- Alvester Garnett – drums (tracks 2, 5, 6)
- Taru Alexander – drums (track 9)
- Arthur Green – background vocals (track 9)
- Bazzi Bartholomew Gray – background vocals (track 9)
- Savion Glover – tap dance (track 2)
