= It's Me (album) =

Studio album by Abbey Lincoln
- Released: 2003
- Recorded: November 25–27, 2002; February 10, 2003
- Studio: Sear Sound, New York City; Right Track Studios, New York City
- Genre: Jazz
- Length: 52:43
- Label: Verve, Gitanes Jazz; 038 171-2
- Producer: Daniel Richard, Jean-Philippe Allard

Abbey Lincoln chronology
Over the Years (2000)	It's Me (2003)	Abbey Sings Abbey (2007)

It's Me is an album by jazz vocalist Abbey Lincoln. It was recorded during November 25–27, 2002, at Sear Sound in New York City, and was released in 2003 by Verve Records and Gitanes Jazz Productions. On the album, Lincoln is joined by saxophonist and flutist James Spaulding, saxophonist Julien Lourau, pianist Kenny Barron, double bassist Ray Drummond, and drummer Jaz Sawyer. Seven tracks also feature an orchestra, the recordings of which were overdubbed on February 10, 2003, at Right Track Studios in New York City. The music on the orchestral tracks was arranged and conducted by Alan Broadbent and Laurent Cugny.

== Reception ==
Professional ratings
Review scores
Source	Rating
AllMusic	4/5 stars
The Encyclopedia of Popular Music	3/5 stars
The Penguin Guide to Jazz	3/4 stars

In a review for AllMusic, Robert L. Doerschuk wrote: "Whether working with or without strings, [Lincoln] maintains a sophisticated and intimate tunefulness; her adherence to melody, and to subtle phrasing as an alternative to showy improvisation, has always earned comparisons to the work of Billie Holiday, though in this case Lincoln more than matches and arguably surpasses much of the legendary singer's work."

A reviewer for All About Jazz stated: "Lincoln continues to produce timeless recordings... It's Me is as strong as any entry in her half-century discography... Lincoln shows us again that she excels in being both a most memorable interpreter and an original singer/songwriter."

The authors of The Penguin Guide to Jazz Recordings praised the title track and Cedar Walton's "The Maestro," where Barron's "genius shines out alongside Abbey's gift as a lyricist." However, they noted that "one increasingly feels that Lincoln has now settled into a reliably grand manner which will see her through."

Mark Anthony Neal of PopMatters commented: "so much of Lincoln's verve is about her voice — those once disparaged flat tones — and the myriad of colors that Lincoln summons within those tones... it's Lincoln's loyal fans and new converts who most benefit, as we've been able to witness 'A Woman at Her Peak'... in the autumn of her life."

A writer for Billboard remarked: "When Abbey Lincoln sings, people listen, especially aspiring—as well as established—female vocalists... [she] vocalizes with authority; her husky, dark-tinged voice is drenched in melancholy, buoyant with joy and steeped in wisdom."

CMJ New Music Report's Tad Hendrickson wrote: "Through a myriad of colors, moods, emotions and her singular... vocal range... Lincoln comes closer to the spirit of Billie Holiday's music than any of her peers... [she] puts forth yet another strong effort... the album's highlight is the gospel-flavored title cut - the voice and piano arrangement is solid with exceptional performances by Lincoln and pianist Kenny Barron."

== Track listing ==
1. "Skylark" (Hoagy Carmichael, Johnny Mercer) – 5:25
2. "Love Is Made" (Abbey Lincoln) – 4:02
3. "Chateaux de Joux" (Abbey Lincoln) – 4:38
4. "It's Me, O' Lord (Standin' in the Need of Prayer)" (Abbey Lincoln, traditional) – 3:42
5. "They Call It Jazz" (Abbey Lincoln) – 5:14
6. "Through the Years" (Abbey Lincoln) – 4:30
7. "Runnin' Wild" (Arthur Gibbs, Joe Grey, Leo Wood) – 3:52
8. "The Maestro" (Cedar Walton) – 5:25
9. "The Search" (Robert Wooldridge) – 5:31
10. "Yellow Bird" (Irving Burgie) – 4:45
11. "Can You Dig It" (Abbey Lincoln) – 5:39

== Personnel ==
- Abbey Lincoln – vocals
- James Spaulding – alto saxophone, flute
- Julien Lourau – tenor saxophone, soprano saxophone
- Kenny Barron – piano
- Ray Drummond – double bass
- Jaz Sawyer – drums

Orchestra (tracks 1–3, 5–6, 9–10)

- Alan Broadbent – conductor, arranger (tracks 2, 5, 9)
- Laurent Cugny – conductor, arranger (tracks 1, 3, 6, 10)
- Susan Niedel-Palma, Susan Rotholv – flute
- Steve Hartman, Shari Hoffman – clarinet
- Bob Carlisle, Dan Culpepper, Jeff Lang, Stewart Rose – French horn
- Sanford Allen, Jonathan Dinklege, Joyce Hammann, Ashley Horn, Regis Iandiorio, Pauline Kim, Belinda Whitney, Kristof Witek, Robin Zeh – violin
- Ted Ackerman, Akua Dixon Turre, David Heiss, Ariane Lallemand, Richard Locker, Alexandra McKenzie, Kermit Moore – cello
