= It's Magic (Abbey Lincoln album) =

Studio album by Abbey Lincoln
- Released: 1958
- Recorded: July 24 & August 15, 1958; New York City
- Genre: Jazz
- Length: 35:48
- Label: Riverside; RLP 12-277
- Producer: Orrin Keepnews

Abbey Lincoln chronology
That's Him! (1957)	It's Magic (1958)	Abbey Is Blue (1959)

It's Magic is the third album by American jazz vocalist Abbey Lincoln featuring tracks recorded in 1958 for the Riverside label.

== Reception ==
Professional ratings
Review scores
Source	Rating
Allmusic	4.5/5 stars
The Penguin Guide to Jazz Recordings	3/4 stars
The Rolling Stone Jazz & Blues Album Guide	3/5 stars
The Virgin Encyclopedia of Jazz	4/5 stars

The editors of AllMusic awarded the album 4½ stars, and reviewer Scott Yanow stated: "Because Abbey Lincoln has always been careful to sing songs that have a deep meaning for her, all of her recordings through the years are memorable in their own way; there are no duds in her discography... Recommended".

In an article for The Guardian, John Fordham noted that the album finds Lincoln "taking on the agenda and urgency of the civil rights movement and the edginess of a freer kind of jazz still to come," and commented: "'Ain't Nobody's Business'... and 'Little Niles'... are lyrically irresistible."

== Track listing ==
1. "I Am in Love" (Cole Porter) – 2:49
2. "It's Magic" (Sammy Cahn, Jule Styne) – 4:03
3. "Just for Me" (Jimmy Komack) – 3:36
4. "An Occasional Man" (Ralph Blane, Hugh Martin) – 3:23
5. "Ain't Nobody's Business" (Porter Grainger, Everett Robbins) – 4:29
6. "Out of the Past" (Benny Golson, Jon Hendricks) – 4:46
7. "Music, Maestro, Please!" (Herb Magidson, Allie Wrubel) – 3:18
8. "Love" (Blane, Martin) – 2:41
9. "Exactly Like You" (Dorothy Fields, Jimmy McHugh) – 2:55
10. "Little Niles" (Randy Weston, Hendricks) – 5:03
- Recorded in New York City on July 24 (tracks 3–5, 7 & 9) and August 15 (tracks 1, 2, 6, 8 & 10), 1958

== Personnel ==
- Abbey Lincoln – vocals
- Kenny Dorham (tracks 3–5, 7 & 9), Art Farmer (tracks 1–2, 6, 8 & 10) – trumpet
- Curtis Fuller – trombone (tracks 1, 3, 4, 7 & 8)
- Benny Golson – tenor saxophone
- Jerome Richardson (tracks 3–4 & 7), Sahib Shihab (tracks 1 & 8) – baritone saxophone, flute
- Wynton Kelly – piano
- Paul Chambers (tracks 3–5, 7 & 9), Sam Jones (tracks 1–2, 6, 8 & 10) – bass
- Philly Joe Jones – drums
