= Over the Years (Abbey Lincoln album) =

Studio album by Abbey Lincoln
- Released: 2000
- Recorded: February 18–21, 2000; April 23, 2000
- Studio: Right Track Studios, New York City; BMG Studios, New York City
- Genre: Jazz
- Length: 50:57
- Label: Verve, Gitanes Jazz; 549 101-2
- Producer: Daniel Richard, Jean-Philippe Allard

Abbey Lincoln chronology
| Wholly Earth (1999) | Over the Years (2000) | It's Me (2003) |

Over the Years is an album by jazz vocalist Abbey Lincoln, released in 2000 by Verve Records and Gitanes Jazz Productions. Nine of the album's ten tracks were recorded during February 18–21, 2000, at Right Track Studios in New York City, while the remaining track was recorded on April 23, 2000, at BMG Studios in New York City. On the album, Lincoln is joined by saxophonist Joe Lovano, trumpeter Jerry González, cellist Jennifer Vincent, guitarist Kendra Shank, pianist Brandon McCune, double bassist John Ormond, and drummer Jaz Sawyer.

== Reception ==
Professional ratings
Review scores
| Source | Rating |
|---|---|
| AllMusic | 4/5 stars |
| The Penguin Guide to Jazz | 3/4 stars |
| The Virgin Encyclopedia of Jazz | 3/5 stars |

In a review for AllMusic, Dave Nathan noted that "the play list is rather unusual even for an iconoclast like Lincoln,, and wrote: "Over the Years is aimed at summing up Abbey Lincoln's long career... it is Lincoln's special interpretative powers that carry the day, as one would expect."

The authors of The Penguin Guide to Jazz Recordings stated that the group "sounds well drilled and responsive, delivering the kind of taut, thoughtful and ever-alert accompaniment Betty Carter used to demand of her young sidemen."

Critic Gary Giddins called the album "another splendid addition to her series", and commented: "Am I missing somebody, or is Lincoln the first great singer-songwriter in jazz since Fats Waller?"

Mathew Bahl of All About Jazz remarked: "Ms. Lincoln's voice certainly lacks the power, range and intensity it had in her youth, but her intonation and articulation are still precise. More importantly, her work now is so much richer and more expressive that it is as if the intervening decades had changed the meaning of the words." Regarding Lincoln's vocal delivery, another All About Jazz reviewer wrote: "In its maturity, there's even more of that, husky, dark and musical appeal that makes Lincoln's singing so alluring... Highly recommended."

== Track listing ==
1. "When the Lights Go On Again" (Bennie Benjamin, Sol Marcus, Eddie Seiler) – 5:53
2. "Blackberry Blossoms" (traditional, Abbey Lincoln) – 4:08
3. "Somos Novios" (Armando Manzanero) – 6:11
4. "A Heart Is Not a Toy" (Abbey Lincoln) – 4:14
5. "I Could Write It for a Song" (Abbey Lincoln) – 4:20
6. "I'm Not Supposed to Know" (Abbey Lincoln) – 3:59
7. "The Windmills of Your Mind" (Michel Legrand, Alan and Marilyn Bergman) – 5:03
8. "Lucky to Be Me" (Leonard Bernstein, Betty Comden, Adolph Green) – 7:30
9. "What Will Tomorrow Bring" (Abbey Lincoln) – 6:27
10. "Tender as a Rose" (Phil Moore) – 3:23

== Personnel ==
- Abbey Lincoln – vocals
- Joe Lovano – tenor saxophone (tracks 1, 2, 5–7, 9)
- Jerry González – trumpet (tracks 3, 6)
- Jennifer Vincent – cello (tracks 1, 9)
- Kendra Shank – guitar (track 2)
- Brandon McCune – piano
- John Ormond – double bass
- Jaz Sawyer – drums
