= Ehud Ettun =

Israeli bassist, composer and bandleader

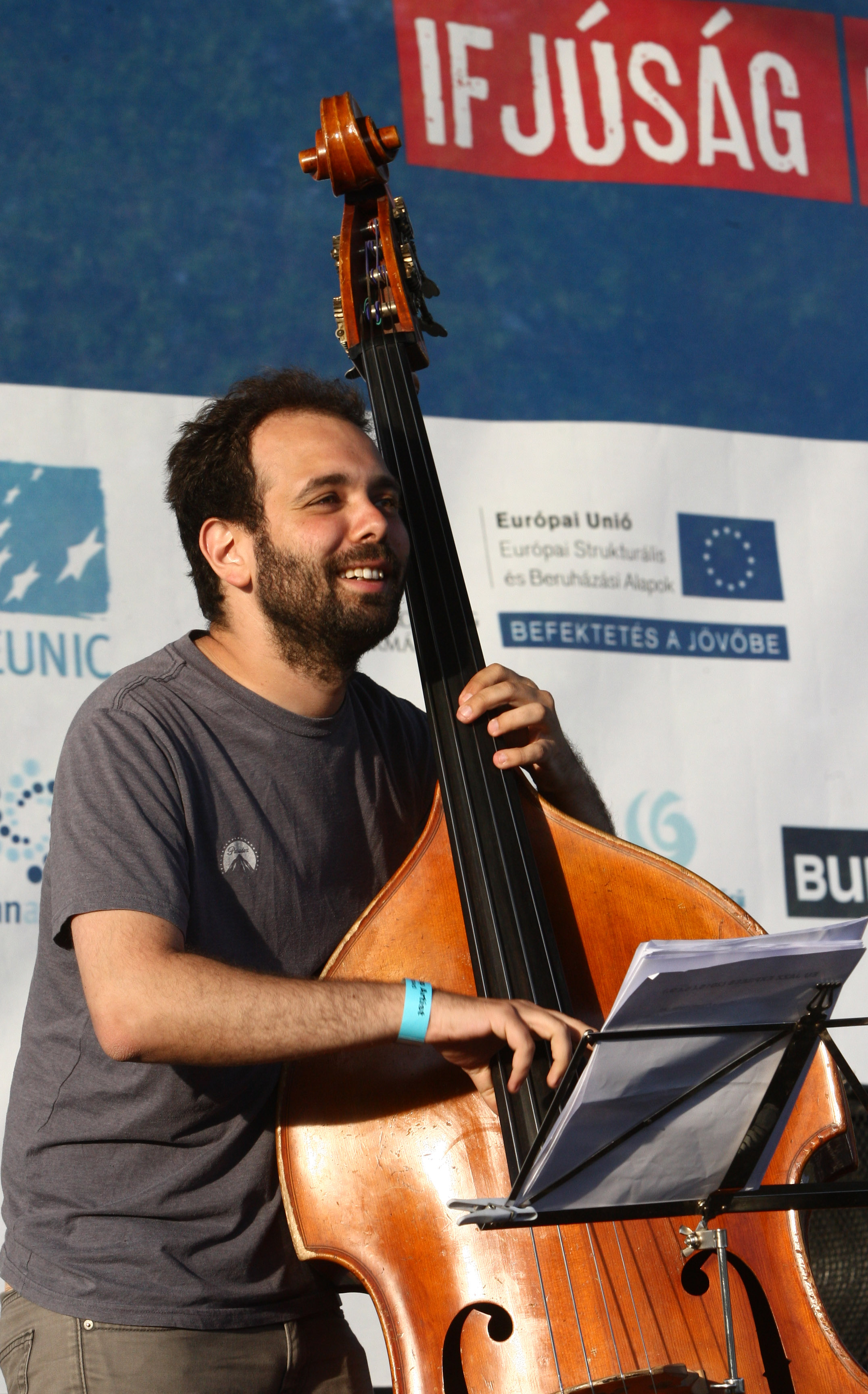
Ehud Ettun, 2015

Ehud Ettun (Hebrew: אהוד אטון; born May 21, 1987) is an Israeli bassist, composer and bandleader.

== Early life and education ==
Ettun was born in Israel and started playing the piano at the age of six. When he was twelve, he picked up the guitar and played Israeli music in different young bands in Jerusalem. At the age of 16 Ettun was accepted to the Israeli Arts and Sciences Academy, where he started studying the bass with maestro Michael Klinghoffer, ear training with Professor Batsheva Rubinstein and composition with Prof. Andre Haidu. Ettun continued his studies at the Jerusalem Music Academy, and upon graduating, he received a scholarship to attend the New England Conservatory in Boston to pursue his master's degree. At the conservatory, Ettun studied with Donny Mccaslin, Fred Hersch, Hankus Netsky and others, receiving his master's degree in 2012.

== Career ==
As a bandleader and composer, Ettun has released two albums. The first one, "Half Colors Half Voices", which is a collaboration with pianist Uriel Herman, is a project of new compositions to poems by Israeli poet Rachel Bluwstein, received wide media attention in Israel including reviews in Haaretz, Yedioth Ahronoth, channel 2 and more. His second album "Heading North", was an all self composed album, and it features Japanese pianist Haruka Yabuno, and Israeli musicians Nathan Blankett and Tal Gur.

As a sideman, Ettun has collaborated with top musicians from Israel and the United States including Fred Hersch, Eli Degibri, George Garzone, Anat Cohen, Miri Mesika and others. He has performed at the Panama Jazz Festival, Red Sea Jazz Festival, Blue Note Jazz club, Kennedy Center in Washington, D.C., and other classical and Jazz venues.

== Discography ==
=== As a bandleader ===
- Deep in the Mountains – 2019
- BiPolar (with Haruka Yabuno) – 2014
- Raw Gestures – 2013
- Heading North (Internal Compass Records, 2012)
- Half Voices Half Colors (Tovanot Veod, 2009)

=== As a sideman ===
- Naked/ assaf kehati trio
- Childhood Places / Devin Roth(2012)
- 4 Quarters / Guy Kark(2010)
- Air Portrait / Tal Gur (2008)
