= Doug Sides =

American jazz musician (1942–2024)

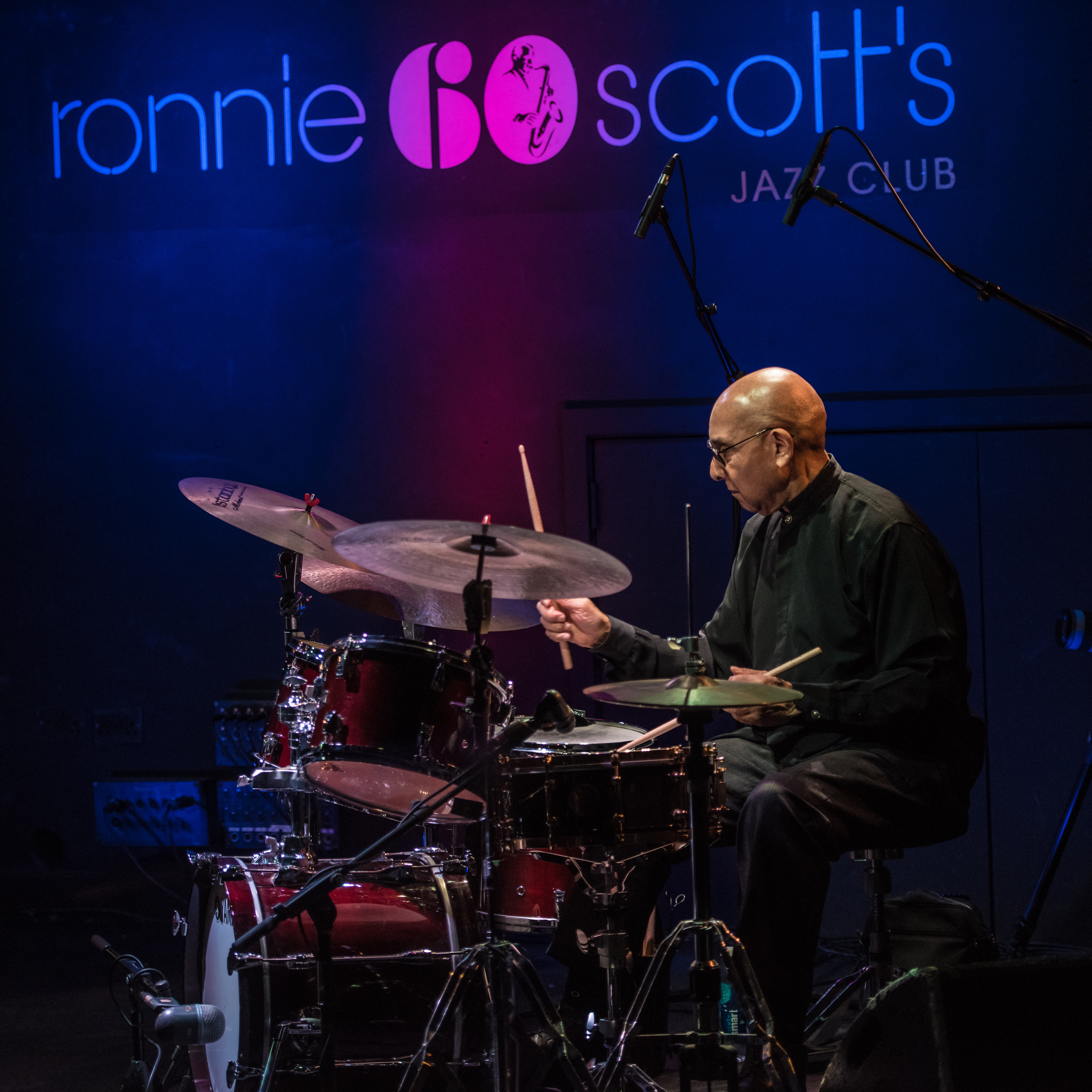
- Sides performing in 2021

Background information
- Birth name: Douglas Joseph Sides
- Born: October 10, 1942; Los Angeles, California, U.S.
- Died: October 8, 2024 (aged 81); Ramsgate, Kent, England
- Genres: Jazz
- Instrument: Drums
- Years active: 1960–2024

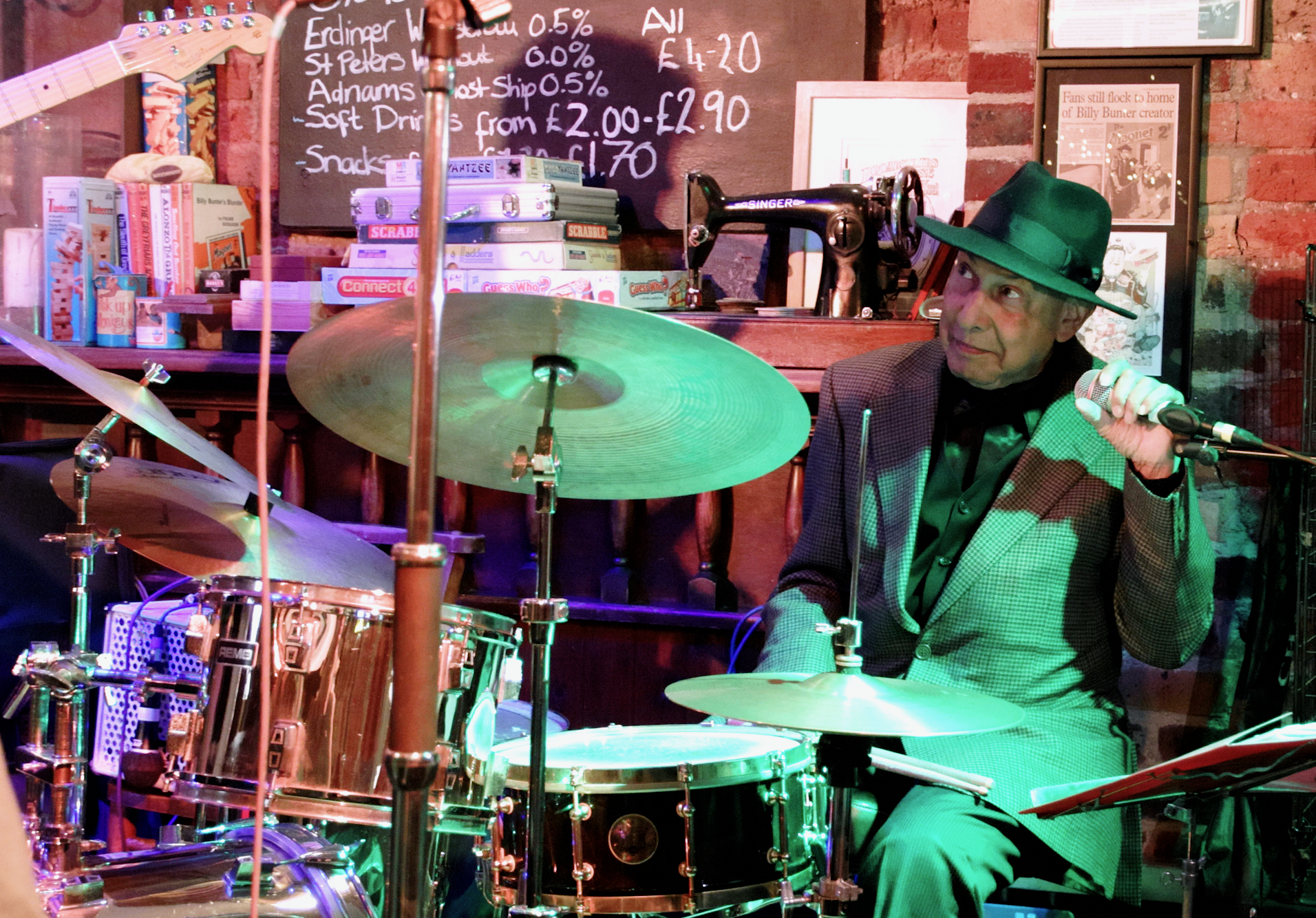
Doug Sides, Broadstairs Jazz Festival

Douglas Joseph Sides (October 10, 1942 – October 10, 2024) was an American jazz drummer and composer.

== Early life and career ==
Doug started playing the piano when he was four years old. Later he became interested in playing timpani and drums in general. Sides attended USC, NYU, and Berklee College of Music, and worked in the early 1960s with Illinois Jacquet, Teddy Edwards, Lionel Hampton, Johnny Griffin, Howard Rumsey, Curtis Amy, Harold Land, Sonny Stitt, Charles Kynard, and Buddy Collette. In 1962, Doug did his first recording session with saxophonist Johnny Griffin (Grab This!). In February 1963, he worked in a recording with saxophonist Curtis Amy (Katanga!). He served in the US Armed Forces from 1964 to 1966, then worked with Merle Saunders and John Handy in San Francisco. With this last one, Doug did a live recording on 27 June 1967, at the Village Gate in New York City, which later was released as New View (Columbia CS 9497). In 1968 he moved back to Los Angeles, and worked with Bobby Hutcherson, Phineas Newborn, O.C. Smith, and Blue Mitchell. In the 1970s he worked with Kai Winding and Abdullah Ibrahim; in the 1980s he was a touring drummer for Abbey Lincoln and Jon Hendricks.

In 1988, Sides toured Europe and played in the Netherlands with Joe van Enkhuisen; the following year he moved there. He subsequently played in Europe with Benny Bailey, Tete Montoliu, Steve Grossman, Tom Harrell, Walter Bishop, Jr., Ralph Sutton, Ranee Lee, Hank Jones, Oliver Jones, Don Bennett, Fritz Krisse, Ricky Ford, Monty Alexander, and Benny Golson.

== Later life and death ==
Having lived in Paris for many years, Sides and his wife, Mary-Ann, moved to Margate, Kent in 2010. They later relocated to Ramsgate, Kent in 2022. Sides was a part of the local jazz scene, playing weekly at the Lifeboat Pub jazz jam session. In 2016, he played at the Margate Jazz Festival.

Sides died at home two days after appearing at the Broadstairs Jazz Festival, on October 10, 2024, at the age of 82.

== Sources ==
- "Doug Sides". The New Grove Dictionary of Jazz. 2nd edition, ed. Barry Kernfeld, 2004.
