= Harold Spina =

American composer (1906–1997)

Harold Spina (21 June 1906 – 18 July 1997) was an American composer of popular songs. His best-known work happened in the early 1930s, when he collaborated with lyricists Johnny Burke and Joe Young on songs such as "Annie Doesn't Live Here Anymore", "You're Not the Only Oyster in the Stew", "My Very Good Friend the Milkman" (these two hits for Fats Waller), "Shadows on the Swanee", "The Beat of My Heart", "Now You've Got Me Doing It", and "I've Got a Warm Spot in My Heart for You". He also collaborated with lyricist John Elliot for several songs, including "It's So Nice To Have A Man Around The House" (made famous by Dinah Shore).

== In popular culture ==
In the movie Topper Returns (1941), after the character Annie (played by Carole Landis) is nearly killed by a falling chandelier, the character Gail (played by Joan Blondell) exclaims "Six more inches and we'd all be singing 'Annie Doesn't Live Here Anymore.'"

The Martin Scorsese film title Alice Doesn't Live Here Anymore is a reference to the song Annie Doesn't Live Here Anymore.

"Alice Doesn't Live Here Anymore" was the title of an episode of The Brady Bunch (1969) that aired on October 17, 1969. It was also a reference to the song "Annie Doesn't Live Here Anymore."

== Sources ==
- Lonergan, David F., Hit records, 1950-1975, Scarecrow Press, 2005. ISBN 0-8108-5129-6
- Vosburgh, Dick, Obituary: Harold Spina, The Independent, 9 August 1997
