= Rodney Kendrick =

American jazz pianist and record producer

- Born: April 30, 1958 (age 68)
- Origin: Miami, FL, Pennsylvania, U.S.
- Genres: Jazz
- Occupations: Musician; composer; producer
- Instruments: Piano
- Years active: 1978–present
- Labels: Verve; Polygram; Polydor

Rodney Kendrick (born April 30, 1958) is an American jazz pianist, composer, and record producer. He has been described as a "hard swinging player and composer with a delightful Monkish wit and drive".

== Career ==
At twenty-one, Kendrick began a primary focus on jazz, moving to New York City in 1981. He played keyboards for artists such as Freddie Hubbard, Terence Blanchard, Stanley Turrentine, Clark Terry, J. J. Johnson, and others. He studied with pianist Barry Harris, who remained his teacher and mentor for over 20 years. Kendrick cites Randy Weston and Sun Ra as influences.

== Personal life ==
Kendrick has been married to Rhonda Ross Kendrick since September 14, 1997. They have a son, born in 2009.

== Discography ==
Year recorded	Title	Label	Notes
Jan. 11 & 12, 1993	The Secrets of Rodney Kendrick	Verve	With Roy Hargrove (trumpet), Graham Haynes (cornet), Houston Person (tenor sax), Kenny Garrett (alto sax), others
Dec. 12 & 13, 1993	Dance, World, Dance	Verve	With Arthur Blythe (alto sax), Bheki Mseleku (tenor sax), others
Nov. 15 & 16, 1995	Last Chance for Common Sense	Polygram	With various
Apr. & May, 1996	Who Used to Dance	Verve	With Abbey Lincoln
Aug. 19–21, 1996	Bop!	Telarc	with Frank Morgan
Jul. 1 & 2, 1996	We Don't Die, We Multiply	Polygram	Trio, with Tarus Mateen (bass), Turu Alexander (drums)
1998?	No Dress Code	Polydor (France)	
2004?	Thank You	Rodney Kendrick	
Jan. 31 & Feb. 1, 2014	The Colors of Rhythm	Impulse!	Trio, with Curtis Lundy (bass), Cindy Blackman Santana (drums)
