= Abbey Lincoln =

American singer, actress and activist (1930–2010)

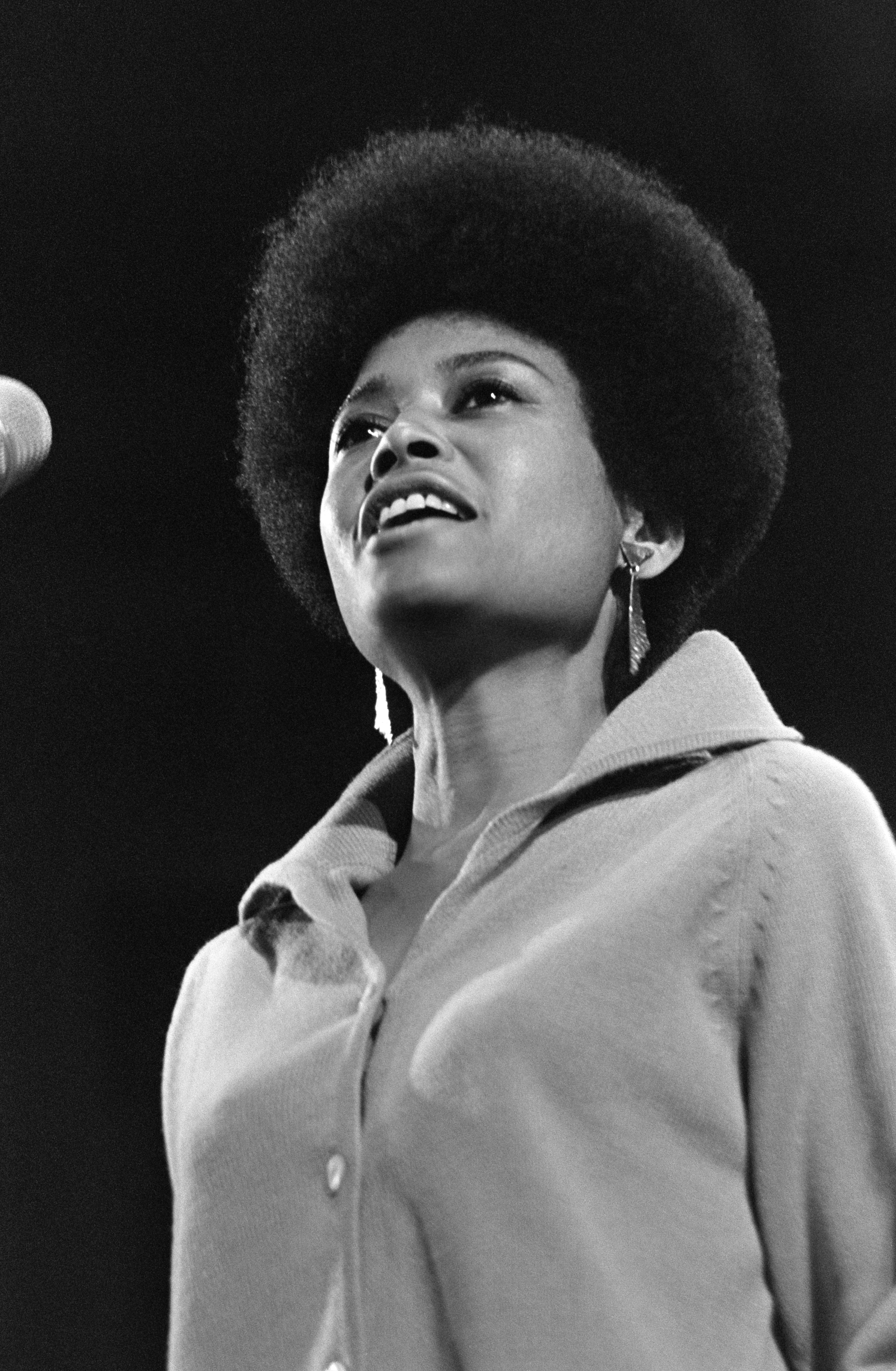
- Lincoln in concert, 1966

Background information
- Also known as: Gaby Lee; Aminata Moseka
- Born: Anna Marie Wooldridge; August 6, 1930; Chicago, Illinois, U.S.
- Died: August 14, 2010 (aged 80) New York City, U.S.
- Genres: Jazz
- Occupations: Singer, actress, and civil rights activist
- Years active: 1956–2007
- Labels: Riverside, Verve, Marge
- Spouse: Max Roach (1962–1970)

Anna Marie Wooldridge (August 6, 1930 – August 14, 2010), known professionally as Abbey Lincoln, was an American jazz vocalist, songwriter, and actress. She was a civil rights activist beginning in the 1960s. Lincoln made a career out of delivering deeply felt presentations of standards, as well as writing and singing her own material.

== Early life ==
Lincoln was born on August 6, 1930, in Chicago, but raised in Calvin Center, Cass County, Michigan. She was the tenth of 12 children. She began singing professionally in Los Angeles, California, and in Honolulu, Hawaii, using stage-names that included Gaby Lee, before eventually choosing to be known as Abbey Lincoln in 1956.

== Career ==
=== Music ===
Lincoln was one of many singers influenced by Billie Holiday. Lincoln's 1956 debut album, Abbey Lincoln's Affair... A Story of a Girl in Love – with Benny Carter, Bob Russell, Marty Paitch, and Jack Montrose – was followed by a series of albums for Riverside Records. In 1960, she sang on Max Roach's landmark civil rights-themed recording We Insist! (subtitled Freedom Now Suite), "regarded as the earliest full-scale protest record in jazz", as historian Nat Hentoff observed. Lincoln's lyrics were often connected to the civil rights movement in America. In 1970, the short film Max and Abbey profiled Lincoln as a composer, vocalist, actress, writer, and activist, as well as Roach's creative partner. Stan Lathan directed the documentary, broadcast on the television program Black Journal.

After a tour of Africa in the mid-1970s, she adopted the name Aminata Moseka. During the 1980s, Lincoln's creative output was smaller and she released only a few albums. By the end of the decade, a recording of the 1934 song "For All We Know", by Lincoln accompanied only by Geri Allen on piano, was featured in the 1989 film Drugstore Cowboy. The song was part of her live repertoire, as documented on the second volume of Abbey Plays Billie, which was recorded in November of 1987, but first released the same year as the film.

During the 1990s and until her death, beginning with The World Is Falling Down, she fulfilled a 10-album contract with Verve Records. These albums are highly regarded and represent a crowning achievement in Lincoln's career. Devil's Got Your Tongue (1992) featured Rodney Kendrick, Grady Tate, Yoron Israel, J. J. Johnson, Stanley Turrentine, Babatunde Olatunji and The Staple Singers, among others. In 2003, Lincoln received a National Endowment for the Arts Jazz Master Award.

Her lyrics often reflected the ideals of the civil rights movement and helped in generating passion for the cause in the minds of her listeners. In addition to her musical career, she ventured into acting as well and appeared in movies such as The Girl Can't Help It (1958), Nothing But a Man (1964) and For Love of Ivy (1968). Lincoln explored more philosophical themes during the later years of her songwriting career and remained professionally active until well into her seventies. She often visited the Blue Note jazz club in New York City.

=== Acting ===
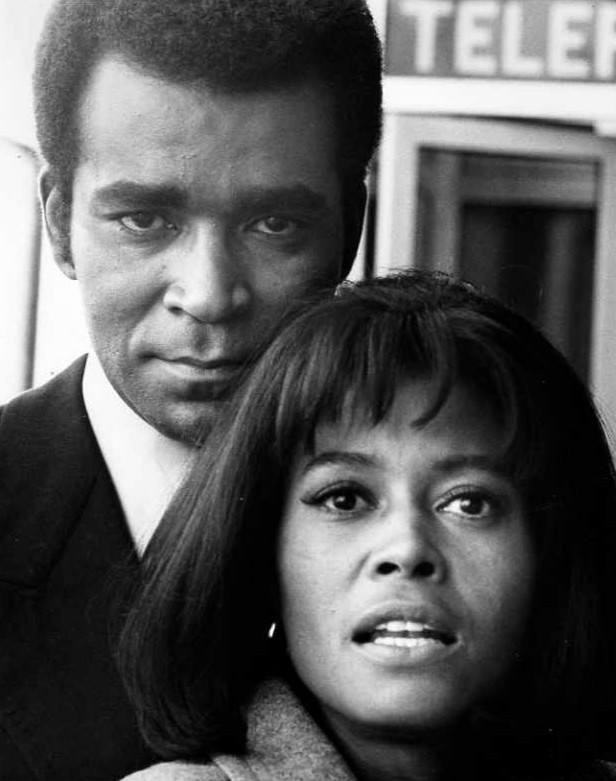
Greg Morris and Lincoln in Mission: Impossible, 1971

In 1956, Lincoln appeared in the musical comedy film The Girl Can't Help It —for which she wore an orange dress that had been worn by Marilyn Monroe in Gentlemen Prefer Blondes (1953)—and interpreted "Spread the World, Spread the Gospel". Lincoln did not like what the Monroe dress symbolized about her treatment in her early career, so she set fire to the dress, destroying it.

With Ivan Dixon, she co-starred in Nothing But a Man (1964), an independent film written and directed by Michael Roemer. In 1968, she co-starred with Sidney Poitier and Beau Bridges in For Love of Ivy, and she received a 1969 Golden Globe nomination for her appearance in the film.

Lincoln's television appearances began in 1968 with The Name of the Game. In March 1969, she appeared in Alice Childress's Wine in the Wilderness, the first of the 10-episode series "On Being Black" presented by WGBH-TV Boston, featuring individual dramas written, produced and performed by Blacks. Lincoln appeared in Mission: Impossible (1971), the TV movie Short Walk to Daylight (1972), Marcus Welby, M.D. (1974), and All in the Family (1978).

In the 1990 Spike Lee movie Mo' Better Blues, Lincoln played the young Bleek's mother Lillian.

=== Activism ===
Following the assassination of Congolese liberation leader Patrice Lumumba, Lincoln was a notable participant a group of African-American activists, including Max Roach, Rosa Guy, and Maya Angelou, who burst into a United Nations Security Council meeting in a protest demonstration on February 15, 1961. (Lincoln, Guy and Angelou had had a prior meeting with Malcolm X at the Shabazz Restaurant in Harlem to solicit his opinion, and he had "let them know that he was impressed by their activism against the global imperialism of Belgium and the United States".)

== Personal life ==
Lincoln was married from 1962 to 1970 to drummer Max Roach, whose daughter from a previous marriage, Maxine, appeared on several of Lincoln's albums.

Lincoln opened a national conversation by highlighting natural hair. Lincoln produced the "Naturally 62" fashion show, which featured Grandassa models wearing natural hair. Before the mid-1960s, African-American women were expected to straighten their hair with the use of a hot comb. This fashion show aligned with the "Black is beautiful" movement that celebrated natural black beauty.

In 2007, Lincoln had open-heart surgery. Lincoln died on August 14, 2010, in Manhattan, New York, eight days after her 80th birthday. Her death was announced by her brother, David Wooldridge, who told The New York Times that she had died in a Manhattan nursing home after suffering deteriorating health since undergoing open-heart surgery in 2007. No cause of death was officially given. She was cremated and her ashes were scattered.

== Discography ==
=== As leader/co-leader ===
- Abbey Lincoln's Affair... A Story of a Girl in Love (Liberty, 1957)
- That's Him! (Riverside, 1958) – rec. 1957
- It's Magic (Riverside, 1958)
- Abbey Is Blue (Riverside, 1959)
- Straight Ahead (Candid, 1961)
- People in Me (Philips, 1973)
- Live in Misty (Kiva, 1973)
- Sessions, Live with Buddy Collette and Les Thompson (Calliope, 1976) – live rec. 1957–1958
- Golden Lady with Archie Shepp (Inner City, 1981; reissued as Painted Lady ITM, 1987)
- Talking to the Sun with Steve Coleman (Enja, 1984)
- Abbey Sings Billie (Enja, 1989)
- The World Is Falling Down (Verve, 1990)
- You Gotta Pay the Band with Stan Getz (Verve, 1991)
- Devil's Got Your Tongue (Verve, 1992)
- Abbey Sings Billie, Volume 2 (Enja, 1992)
- When There Is Love with Hank Jones (Verve/Gitanes Jazz, 1993)
- Live/Music Is the Magic (ITM, 1994) – live rec. 1993
- A Turtle's Dream (Verve/Gitanes Jazz, 1995)
- Who Used to Dance (Verve/Gitanes Jazz, 1997)
- Wholly Earth (Verve/Gitanes Jazz, 1999) – rec. 1998
- Over the Years (Verve/Gitanes Jazz, 2000)
- It's Me (Verve/Gitanes Jazz, 2003) – rec. 2002–2003
- Abbey Sings Abbey (Verve/Universal, 2007) – rec. 2006

Posthumous releases

- Sophisticated Abbey: Live at the Keystone Korner (HighNote, 2015) – live rec. 1980
- Love Having You Around: Live at the Keystone Korner Vol. 2 (HighNote, 2016) – live rec. 1980

=== As guest ===
With Max Roach

- Moon Faced and Starry Eyed (Mercury, 1959)
- We Insist! Freedom Now Suite (Candid, 1960)
- Percussion Bitter Sweet (Impulse!, 1961)
- It's Time (Impulse!, 1962)
- Sounds as a Roach (Joker (Jp), 1977) – live rec. 1968
- Love for Sale (West Wind, 1999) – live rec. 1964

With others

- Eric Dolphy and Benny Bailey, Newport Rebels (Candid, 1961)
- Frank Morgan, A Lovesome Thing (Antilles, 1991)
- Bheki Mseleku, Timelessness (Verve, 1994)
- Mal Waldron, Soul Eyes (BMG/RCA Victor, 1997)
- Cedar Walton, The Maestro (Muse, 1981)
- Steve Williamson, A Waltz for Grace (Verve, 1990)

Posthumous releases

- Orchestral Manoeuvres in the Dark, English Electric (BMG, 2013)
