= Violet Skies =

British singer

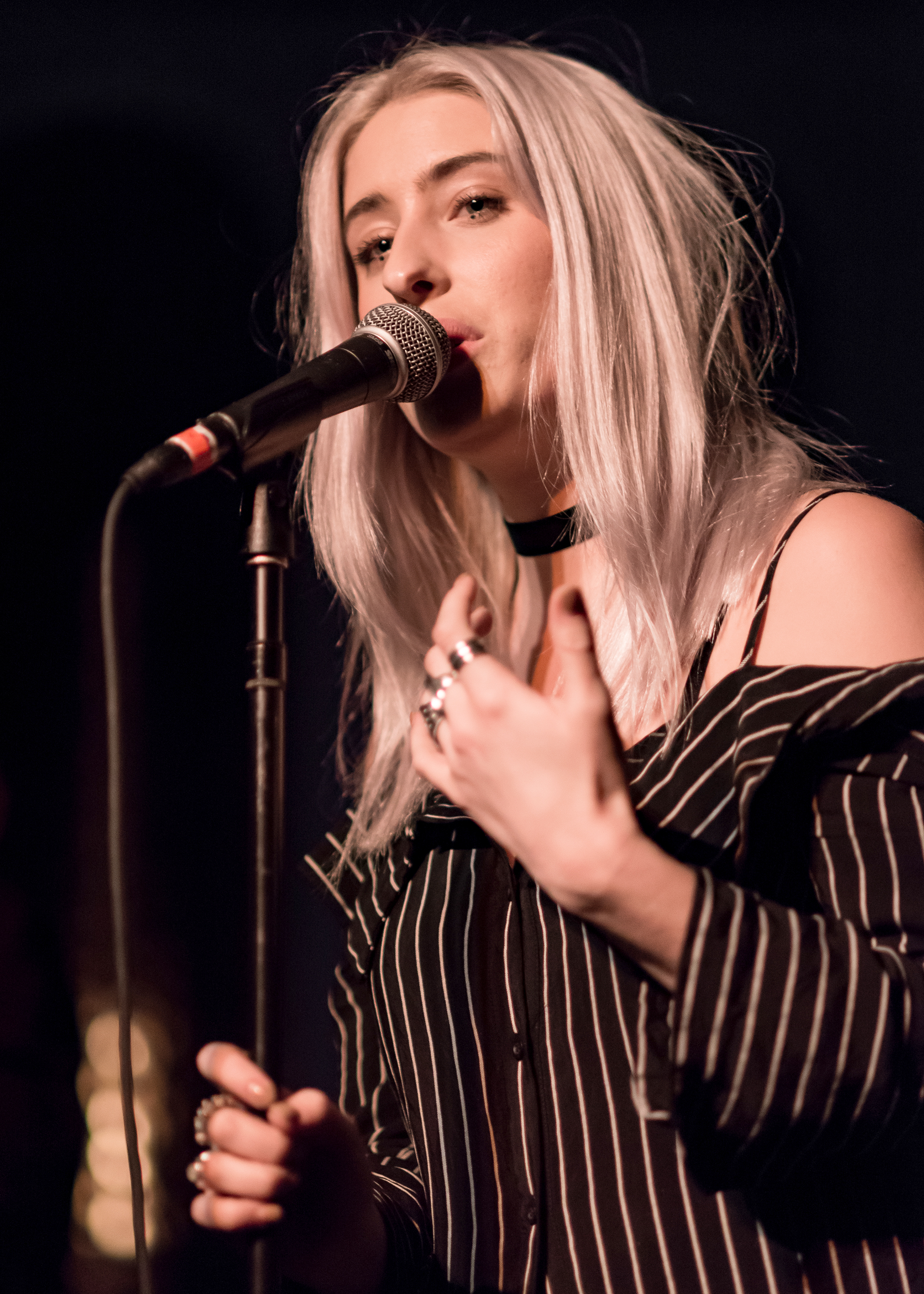
- Skies performing in 2018

Background information
- Born: Hannah Berney; Chepstow, Monmouthshire, Wales, U.K.
- Genres: Pop, electronic, alternative rock, classical
- Occupation: Singer-songwriter
- Years active: 2013–present
- Website: www.iamvioletskies.com

Hannah Katie Berney, known professionally as Violet Skies, is a Welsh singer-songwriter from Chepstow.

== Musical career ==
In 2013, Violet Skies released her first song, "How the Mighty". WalesOnline called it "a pulsing, classically arranged electro slow-burner of a song that merges Massive Attack with a haunting piano and the singer's equally stark and soulful vocals", and it included the song on its list of the 51 greatest Welsh pop records of 2013.

In June 2014 she released her debut solo EP, Dragons, and played at the Glastonbury Festival on the BBC Introducing Stage. That same summer, she played a headline London show and later opened for A Great Big World at Bush Hall in Shepherd's Bush. In January 2015 she released a new song, "Liar".

Violet also released an album and EP with Bristol-based producer Stumbleine through Monotreme Records in early 2014. In June 2019, Skies released the EP I'll Buy a House, which contains four of her singles. A few months later, she released the acoustic version of her EP.

She has also co-written the song "God Is a Dancer" for the British singer Mabel and the Dutch DJ Tiësto. "God Is a Dancer" spent eight weeks in the United Kingdom Top 40, peaking at number 15.

On 3 April 2020 Skies released an EP, Lonely, containing five songs: "Lonely", "Nothing at Night", "Half My Life", "Born On Valentine's Day" and "This Could Be Love".

She co-wrote a number of songs on Lily Allen's surprise October 2025 album release West End Girl.

== Personal life ==
Born Hannah Berney in Chepstow in Monmouthshire, Wales, she was a student at Wyedean School in Sedbury, where she wrote songs with friends during lunch breaks. After graduating, Violet attended Exeter University, where she studied French and history. While at Exeter, she was a contestant on The Voice UK in 2012.

She and Charlie McClean founded sheWrites, a series of woman-only camps for songwriters, producers, and artists, that convene in different places around the world, in order to encourage women to make connections, make songs, and make an impact in the music industry.

When asked about her musical pseudonym, Violet Skies, she said her great-grandmother's name was Violet, and Skies was her mother's idea.

== Discography ==
All credits adapted from Spotify, Apple Music, and the American Society of Composers, Authors and Publishers database.

=== As lead artist ===
==== Singles ====
Year	Title	Writer(s)	Producer(s)
2025	"The Arrow"	Violet Skies, Josh Murty	Josh Murty
2024	"Burning Buildings"	Violet Skies, Heather Sommer, Rob Resnick	Violet Skies, Rob Resnick
2022	"Waiting On A Miracle"	Violet Skies, Ames, K.S. Rhoads	K.S. Rhoads
2022	"Settle (Acoustic)"	Charlie Martin, Joe Housley, Violet Skies	Violet Skies, The Nocturns
2022	"Over The Valley"	Pat Linehan, Violet Skies	Violet Skies, Remy
2022	"We Don't Get Along"	Martin Luke Brown, Violet Skies	Micah Jasper, Violet Skies
2022	"Settle"	Charlie Martin, Joe Housley, Violet Skies	Violet Skies, The Nocturns
2022	"Never Be Cool (Acoustic)"	Violet Skies, Charlie McClean	Charlie McClean
2022	"Never Be Cool"	Violet Skies, Charlie McClean	Charlie McClean
2022	"The Internet (Acoustic)"	Dom Liu, Nick Wilson, Sean McDonagh, Violet Skies	Micah Jasper
2022	"The Internet"	Dom Liu, Nick Wilson, Sean McDonagh, Violet Skies	Micah Jasper
2021	"Talk (Acoustic)" (with Billy Lockett)	Violet Skies, Billy Lockett, Andrea Rocca	Andrea Rocha
2021	"When I Come Home" (with Taska Black)	Violet Skies, Taska Black	Taska Black
2021	"Talk" (with Billy Lockett)	Violet Skies, Billy Lockett, Andrea Rocca	Andrea Rocha
2020	"Talk" (with Tiësto)	Tiësto, Violet Skies, Luke Storrs, Micah Jasper	Tiësto, Luke Storrs, Micah Jasper
2020	"Lonely" (with Molly Hammar)	Violet Skies, Danny Casio	Violet Skies, Danny Casio
2020	"Half My Life"	Violet Skies, Thomas Daniel, Christian Fiore	Christian Fiore, Micah Jasper
2020	"Bruises"	James Earp, Lewis Capaldi	Mahogany
2019	"Two of Us This Christmas"	Grizzly, Violet Skies	Violet Skies
2019	"This Could Be Love"	Violet Skies, Martin Luke Brown	Violet Skies, Roy Kerr
2019	"Give Me a Reason (Acoustic)"	Charlie McClean, Christian Fiore, Daniel Evans, Thomas Daniel, Violet Skies	Charlie McClean, Christian Fiore, Violet Skies
2019	"Give Me a Reason"	Charlie McClean, Christian Fiore, Daniel Evans, Thomas Daniel, Violet Skies	Charlie McClean, Christian Fiore, Violet Skies
2019	"Is She Gonna Be There? (Acoustic)"	Violet Skies, Harley Moon Kemp, Markus Videsäter, Max Berg	Markus Videsäter, Max Berg, Violet Skies
2019	"Is She Gonna Be There?"	Violet Skies, Harley Moon Kemp, Markus Videsäter, Max Berg	Markus Videsäter, Max Berg, Violet Skies
2018	"Cry for Me (Acoustic)"	Dougie Freeman, Charlie McClean, John Cunningham, Violet Skies	Charlie McClean, Violet Skies
2018	"Cry for Me"	Dougie Freeman, Charlie McClean, John Cunningham, Violet Skies	Manon Grandjean, Charlie McClean, David Burris, John Cunningham, Violet Skies

==== Extended plays ====
List of extended plays, with selected details
Title	EP details
Lonely	Released: April 3, 2020; Label: Violet Skies; Formats: digital download, streaming
Born on Valentine's Day	Released: February 14, 2020; Label: Violet Skies; Formats: digital download, streaming
I'll Buy a House (Acoustic)	Released: August 16, 2019; Label: Violet Skies; Formats: digital download, streaming
I'll Buy a House	Released: June 28, 2019; Label: Violet Skies; Formats: digital download, streaming

==== Albums ====
Title	Details
If I Saw You Again	Released: June 17, 2022; Label: Violet Skies; Formats: digital download, streaming

=== Songwriting credits ===
Year	Title	Artist(s)	Album	Writer(s)	Producer(s)
2026	"I Think He's Got a Girl"	Slayyyter	Worst Man in America	Slayyyter, Austin Dale Corona, Violet Skies, Wyatt Bernad	Austin Dale Corona, Wyatt Bernad
2026	“Dance or Die”	Jules Liesl	Non-album single	Jules Liesl, Violet Skies, Drew Louis, JoJo Centineo, Phoenix Stone, Sophie Zurawel	Drew Louis, JoJo Centineo, Phoenix Stone
2026	"Rewire"	Au/Ra	Heartcore	Au/Ra, Micah Jasper, Violet Skies	Micah Jasper
2026	"Irony"	Le Sserafim	Pureflow Pt. 1	Tropkillaz, Score (13), Megatone (13), Nija Charles, Huh Yunjin, Maya Mougey, "Hitman" Bang, Violet Skies, Tyler Lewis, Hwang Yu-bin (XYXX), Park Woo-hyun, Youra (Full8loom), J14 (Full8loom), Kim Soo-ji, Danke	13, Tropkillaz, "Hitman" Bang
2025	"Good Stuff"	Karina	Synk: Aexsis Line	Karina, Violet Skies, Ruth-Anne Cunningham, Jacob Manson, Imlay	Jacob Manson, Imlay
2025	"Sleepwalking"	Lily Allen	West End Girl	Lily Allen, Violet Skies, Leroy Clampitt, Maaike Kito Lebbing, Blue May	Lily Allen, Blue May, Maaike Kito Lebbing, Seb Chew, Leroy Clampitt, Oscar Scheller, Violet Skies
2025	"Madeline"	Lily Allen	West End Girl	Lily Allen, Violet Skies, Chaz Carter, Jeremy Malvin, Blue May	Lily Allen, Blue May, Maaike Kito Lebbing, Seb Chew, Micah Jasper, Chrome Sparks, Leon Vynehall, Violet Skies
2025	"Relapse"	Lily Allen	West End Girl	Lily Allen, Violet Skies, Maaike Kito Lebbing, Blue May, Oscar Scheller	Lily Allen, Blue May, Maaike Kito Lebbing, Seb Chew, Oscar Scheller, Leon Vynehall, Violet Skies
2025	"Dallas Major"	Lily Allen	West End Girl	Lily Allen, Violet Skies, Chaz Carter, Jeremy Malvin, Blue May	Lily Allen, Blue May, Maaike Kito Lebbing, Seb Chew, Chrome Sparks, Micah Jasper, Violet Skies
2025	"Beg for Me"	Lily Allen	West End Girl	Lily Allen, Violet Skies, Lumidee Cedeño, Leroy Clampitt, Maaike Kito Lebbing, Steven Marsden, Blue May, Teddy Mendez, Edwin Perez	Lily Allen, Blue May, Maaike Kito Lebbing, Seb Chew, Leroy Clampitt, Leon Vynehall, Violet Skies
2025	"Let You W/In"	Lily Allen	West End Girl	Lily Allen, Violet Skies, Micah Grossman, Jeremy Malvin, Blue May	Lily Allen, Blue May, Maaike Kito Lebbing, Seb Chew, Leroy Clampitt, Oscar Scheller, Chloe Angelides
2025	"Who Thought I Knew"	Freya Skye	Non-album single	Violet Skies, Ella Boh, Davin Kingston, Freya Skye	Ella Boh, David Kingston
2025	"Your Love"	Jisoo	Amortage	Violet Skies, Jisoo, Jack Brady, Jordan Roman, Lilian Caputo, Jenna Raine	Blissoo, The Wavys
2024	"Money Mad"	Trinity the Tuck	Sinematic	Violet Skies, Drew Louis, Jayelle	Drew Louis
2024	"The Healing"	Zara Larsson	Venus	Violet Skies, Rick Nowels	Rick Nowels
2024	"Venus"	Zara Larsson	Venus	Violet Skies, Rick Nowels	Rick Nowels, Austin Corona, John Christopher Fee, Manny Marroquin
2024	"No Man's Land"	Venbee, Marshmello	Non-album single	Earwulf, Jonny Lattimer, Nicholas James Gale, Erin Doyle, Violet Skies, Marshmello	Earwulf, Nicholas Gale, Marshmello
2023	"Love Is An Overstatement"	Lauren Spencer Smith	Mirror	Lauren Spencer Smith, Violet Skies, Geena Fontanella, David Burris	Geena Fontanella, David Burris
2023	"Little Bit Sad"	Mae Muller	Sorry I'm Late	Henrik Michelsen, Mae Muller, Violet Skies	Henrik Michelsen
2023	"Like That"	Emma Rena, Micah Jasper	Non-album single	Emma Rena, Micah Jasper, Violet Skies	No producer credited
2023	"Life Goes On"	Solence	Hope is a Cult	David Strääf, Johan Swärd, Markus Videsäter, Violet Skies	David Strääf, Johan Swärd, Markus Videsäter
2022	"Sleep at Night"	Cat Burns	People Pleaser / Sleep at Night	Cat Burns, Violet Skies, Chris Smith	Risc
2022	"Bare Minimum"	Anna Clendening	Untiled X's	Maddy Simmen, Colin Brittain, Anna Clendening, Paige Blue, Violet Skies	Maddy Simmen, Colin Brittain
2022	"Love Ain't Meant To Hurt"	Sarah Close	Non-album single	Sarah Close, Adam Argyle, Violet Skies	Sarah Close, Jmac
2022	"Living Room"	Ava August	Non-album single	Ellen Mary Murphy, Violet Skies, Ava August Zaharek	Lenii, Ellen Murphy
2022	"Selfish"	Bow Anderson	Non-album single	Claire Sarah Anderson, Bow Anderson, Violet Skies, Philip Cook	Phil Cook
2022	"Hallelujah"	Carah Faye	Non-album single	Spencer Peterson, BC Jean, Violet Skies, Carah Faye, Julianne Hope, Sizzy Rocket	No producer credited
2022	"Cruel Intentions"	Lexi Jayde	Closer to Closure	Ben Berger, Ryan Rabin David Roback, Hannah Berney, Alexis Burnett, Hope Sandoval, Violet Skies	Ben Berger, Ryan Rabin
2022	"In the Honey"	Wafia	Non-album single	Mathieu Jomphe Lépine, Lisa Scinta, Violet Skies	Billboard
2022	"Svijet Na Ramenima"	Elis Lovrić	Non-album single	Elis Lovrić, Robin Howl, Violet Skies, Holly Fletcher	No producer credited
2021	"I Still Believe"	Diana Ross	Thank You	Charlie McClean, Autumn Rowe, Violet Skies, Ruth-Anne Cunningham	Charlie McClean, Jack Antonoff
2021	"World on Our Shoulders (Resolution Song)"	SONO	Non-album single	Robin Howl, Holly Fletcher, Violet Skies	No producer credited
2021	"Saturday Night"	Key	Bad Love - The 1st Mini Album	Mich Hansen, Jacob Uchorczak, Danny Shah, Violet Skies	Cutfather, Lee Soo-man
2021	"Tired Of Everybody"	Issey Cross	Non-album single	Danny Casio, Violet Skies, Issey Cross	Danny Casio, The Six
2021	"Super 8"	De'Wayne	Stains	David Burris, De'Wayne Jackson, Micah Jasper, Violet Skies	David Burris, Micah Jasper
2021	"What Happens Now?"	Olivia O'Brien	Episodes: Season 1	Zaire Koalo, Trevor Brown, Violet Skies, Olivia O'Brien	Zaire Koalo, Trevor Brown
2021	"Something for Nothing"	Micah Jasper, Elio	Non-album single	David Burris, Micah Jasper, Violet Skies, Elio	No producer credited
2020	"Echoes"	Lewis Watson	The Love That You Want	Lewis Watson, Sky Adams, Violet Skies	Richard Wilkinson
2020	"Highs & Lows"	Justin Caruso	Non-album single	Justin Caruso, Neil Ormandy, Violet Skies, Nicki Adamsson, Valérie Broussard	Justin Caruso
2020	"20 Seconds"	Jessica Shy, Jovani	Non-album single	Maruks Videsäter, Max Berga, Harleymoon Kemp, Violet Skies	No producer credited
2020	"Doses"	Rika	Non-album single	Jackson Dimiglio-Wood, Violet Skies, Rika	Jackson Dimiglio-Wood
2019	"Like We Used to Do"	Martin & Shirlie	In the Swing of It	Rob Eckland, Violet Skies, Harley Kemp	Rob Eckland, Paul Meehan, Brian Rawling
2019	"God Is A Dancer"	Mabel, Tiësto	The London Sessions	Tiësto, Josh Wilkinson, Violet Skies	Tiësto, Josh Wilkinson, Cameron Gower Poole
2019	"Learning How to Love"	Kalm, River	Non-album single	Jason Strong, Charles Anderson, Colin Magalong, Violet Skies	Kalm
2019	"Du Med Dig"	Miriam Bryant	Non-album single	Miriam Bryant, Selen Ozan, Violet Skies	Selen Ozan
2019	"Come Home To Me"	Léon	Léon	Charlie McClean, Violet Skies, Léon	Charlie McClean
2019	"That's For Me" (featuring Distruction Boyz, DJ Tira, Prince Bulo)	Vanessa Mdee	Non-album single	Vanessa Mdee, Alexsej Vlasenko, Henrik Meinke, Jeremy Chacon, Jonas Kalisch, Nikolaos Giannulidis, Violet Skies	Nikolaos Giannulidis
2018	"Whisper My Name"	Ilira	Non-album single	Hitimpulse, Ilira Gashi, Jaro Omar, Violet Skies	Hitimpulse
