= Grammy Award for Best Album Cover =

Award presented by the Recording Academy

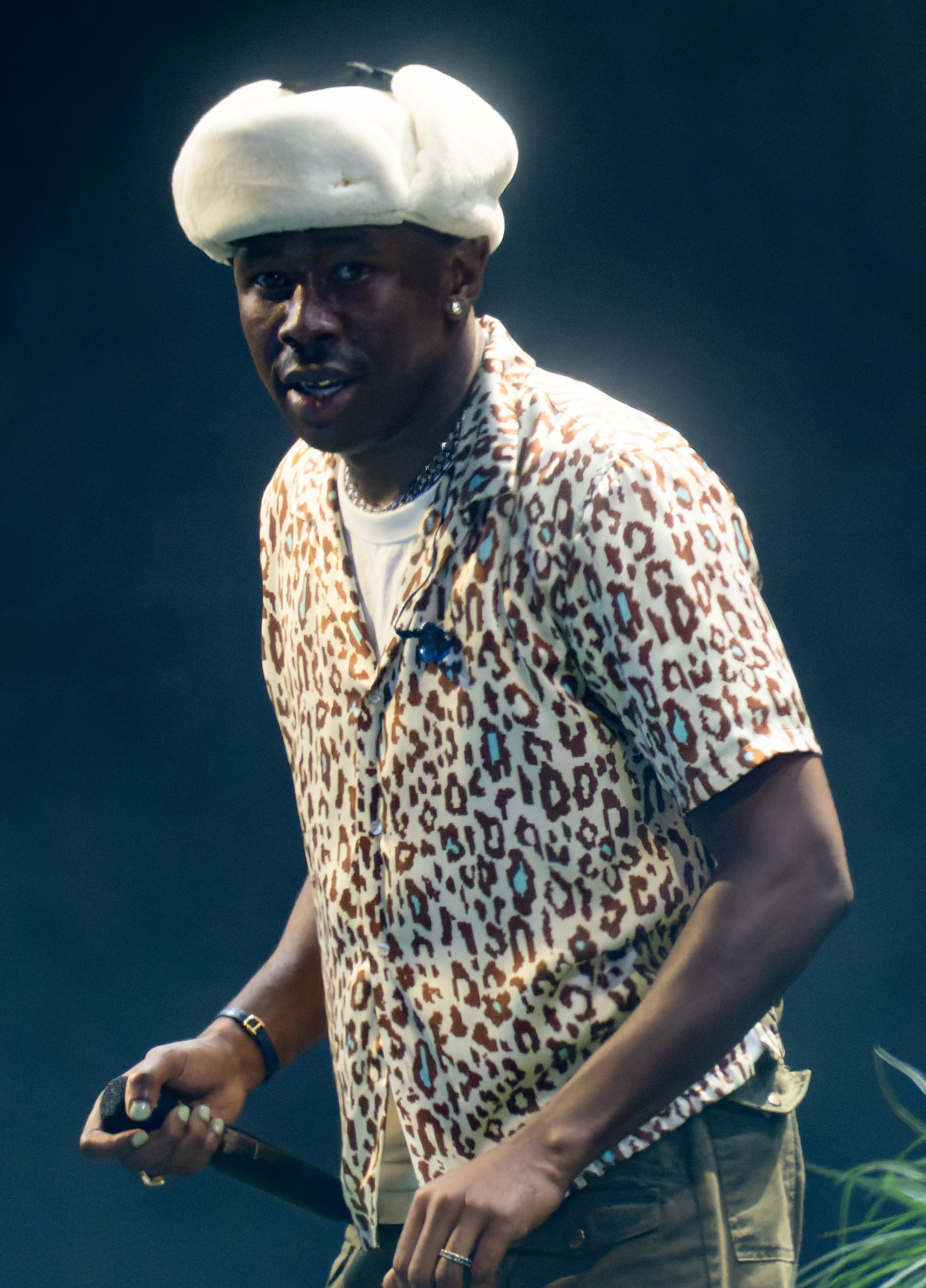
- Chromakopia by Tyler, the Creator is the most recent recipient
- Awarded for: Quality album covers
- Presented by: National Academy of Recording Arts and Sciences
- First award: 1959
- Currently held by: Tyler, the Creator – Chromakopia (2026)

Highlights
- Most wins: Robert M. Jones (6)
- Most nominations: Robert M. Jones (21)
- Website: grammy.com

The Grammy Award for Best Album Cover is an award presented by the Recording Academy to honor quality album covers in any given year. The award was presented for the first time at the 1st Annual Grammy Awards in 1959. It was retired in the 1970s, but returned in 2026. It is a complement to the Best Recording Package category, and sits in the Package, Notes & Historical field.

The academy announced the new category in June 2025, stating that the award "recognizes excellence in cover art for albums or recordings of any genre of music released for the first time during the eligibility year. The elements judged in this category include the creativity, design, illustration, photography, and/or graphic art of the album cover." The eligibility criteria stipulates that the cover must be "predominantly new", and that reissued recordings with minor artwork changes are not eligible. Submissions for this category are also able to be submitted to the Best Recording Package category.

The award goes to the art director(s) of the album.

== Background ==
The category for Best Album Cover was given at the inaugural Grammy Awards in 1959 and was won by Frank Sinatra Sings for Only the Lonely. The category was split into Classical and Non-Classical divisions from 1962 to 1965, and then into Graphic Arts and Photography divisions from 1966 to 1968. It returned back to Best Album Cover in 1969 until 1973. From 1974 onwards, the category was known as Best Album Package (1974-1993) and then its current name Best Recording Package (1994-present).

In 2026, the reestablishment of a Best Album Cover category was announced. Regarding the need for a specific category honoring album covers, Recording Academy CEO Harvey Mason Jr. stated: "In today's digital world, album covers are arguably more impactful than ever. Chances are, there's an iconic cover that's instantly recognizable to you, even if you never owned the physical album. Their cultural significance is undeniable. That's one of the reasons members of the art director community and our Awards & Nominations members felt this Category was necessary. The Packaging Field has always thrived, but we expect this to be one of our most inclusive Categories to date."

== Winners and nominees ==
=== 1950s ===
Year^{[I]}	Work	Art Director(s)	Performing artist(s)
1959
1959	Frank Sinatra Sings for Only the Lonely	Frank Sinatra	Frank Sinatra
1959	Come Fly with Me	Marvin Schwartz	Frank Sinatra
1959	For Whom the Bell Tolls	Ray Rennahan	Ray Heindorf
1959	Ira Ironstrings Plays Music for People with $3.98	David Rose	Ira Ironstrings
1959	Julie	Charles Ward	Julie London

=== 1960s ===
Year^{[I]}	Work	Art Director(s)	Performing artist(s)
1960
1960	Shostakovich: Symphony No. 5	Robert M. Jones	Howard Mitchell
1960	Anatomy of a Murder	Saul Bass	Duke Ellington
1960	For LP Fans Only	Tom Parker	Elvis Presley
1960	Porgy and Bess	Acy Lehman	Lena Horne and Harry Belafonte
1960	The South Shall Rise Again	Acy Lehman and Robert L. Yorke	Phil Harris
1961
1961	Latin ala Lee!	Marvin Schwartz	Peggy Lee
1961	Bean Bags	Marvin Israel	Milt Jackson
1961	Carlos Montoya	Robert M. Jones	Carlos Montoya
1961	Ella Fitzgerald Sings the George and Ira Gershwin Song Book	Sheldon Marks	Ella Fitzgerald
1961	Now! Fred Astaire	Irving Werbin	Fred Astaire
1961	Prokofiev: Alexander Nevsky	Robert M. Jones	Fritz Reiner
1961	Stravinsky: Petrouchka	Robert M. Jones	Pierre Monteux
1961	Tchaikovsky: Nutcracker Suite Excerpts	Robert M. Jones	Fritz Reiner
1961	Wild Percussion and Horns A'Plenty	Robert M. Jones	Dick Schory
1962	Best Album Cover — Other Than Classical		
1962	Judy at Carnegie Hall	Jim Silke	Judy Garland
1962	Breakfast at Tiffany's	Robert M. Jones	Henry Mancini
1962	Jackie's Bag	Reid Miles	Jackie McLean
1962	New Orleans: The Living Legend	Ken Deardoff	Peter Bocage
1962	A Touch of Elegance	Bob Cato	André Previn
1962	Best Album Cover — Classical		
1962	Puccini: Madame Butterfly	Marvin Schwartz	Gabriele Santini
1962	Albéniz: Iberia/Ravel: Rapsodie Espagnole	Robert M. Jones	Jean Paul Morel
1962	Beethoven: 9 Symphonies	Marvin Schwartz	Otto Klemperer
1962	Golden Age of English Lute Music	Meyer Miller	Julian Bream
1962	Gould Ballet Music: Fall River Legend, Interplay, Latin American Symphonette	Reid Miles	Morton Gould
1963	Best Album Cover — Other Than Classical		
1963	Lena...Lovely and Alive	Robert M. Jones	Lena Horne
1963	The Comedy	Loring Eutemey	Modern Jazz Quartet
1963	The First Family	Bill Longcore	Vaughn Meader and Other Artists
1963	The Great Years	Jim Silke	Frank Sinatra
1963	Jazz Samba	John Murello	Stan Getz and Charlie Byrd
1963	Lonely Woman	Loring Eutemey	Modern Jazz Quartet
1963	My Son, the Folk Singer	Ken Kim	Allan Sherman
1963	Potpourri Par Piaf	Ed Thrasher	Édith Piaf
1963	Best Album Cover — Classical		
1963	The Intimate Bach	Marvin Schwartz	Laurindo Almeida, Virginia Majewski and Vincent DeRosa
1963	Bartók: The Miraculous Mandarin/Shostakovich: The Age of Gold	Jim Silke	Robert Irving
1963	Beethoven: Fidelio	Marvin Schwartz	Otto Klemperer
1963	Fauré: Requiem	Marvin Schwartz	Roger Wagner
1963	Otto Klemperer Conducts (Weill: Three Penny Opera Suite and Others)	Marvin Schwartz	Otto Klemperer
1963	Wagner: Prelude and Love Death/R. Strauss: Death and Transfiguration	Marvin Schwartz	Erich Leinsdorf
1964	Best Album Cover — Other Than Classical		
1964	The Barbra Streisand Album	John Berg	Barbra Streisand
1964	Aloha from Norman Luboff	Robert M. Jones	The Norman Luboff Choir
1964	Bach's Greatest Hits	Jim Ladwig	The Swingle Singers
1964	Carl Reiner and Mel Brooks at the Cannes Film Festival	Edward L. Thrasher	Carl Reiner and Mel Brooks
1964	Hollywood My Way	Jim Silke	Nancy Wilson
1964	Honey in the Horn	Robert M. Jones	Al Hirt
1964	Night Train	John Murello	Oscar Peterson
1964	Best Album Cover — Classical		
1964	Puccini: Madama Butterfly	Robert M. Jones	Erich Leinsdorf
1964	Beethoven: Symphony No. 5 in C Minor, Op. 67	John Berg	Leonard Bernstein
1964	Beethoven: Symphony No. 6 in F Major, Op. 68 ("Pastorale")	Robert M. Jones	Fritz Reiner
1964	Evening of Elizabethian Music	Dorle Soria	Julian Bream Consort
1964	Granada (Albéniz: Granada/Granados: Spanish Dance in E Minor/Ponce, Tansman, Aguado: Eight Lessons for Guitar/Sor: Four Studies)	Vladmir Bobri	Andres Segovia
1964	Puccini: Tosca	Dorle Soria	Herbert von Karajan
1964	Strauss: Don Quixote	Bob Cato	Eugene Ormandy
1965	Best Album Cover — Other Than Classical		
1965	People	Bob Cato and Don Bronstein	Barbra Streisand
1965	Getz/Gilberto	Acy Lehman	Stan Getz and João Gilberto
1965	Guitar from Ipanema	George Osak and George Jerman	Laurindo Almeida
1965	Oscar Peterson Plays My Fair Lady	Acy Lehman	Oscar Peterson
1965	Poitier Meets Plato	Ed Thrasher	Sidney Poitier
1965	The Sound of Harlem: Jazz Odyssey, Vol. 3	Bob Cato and Milton Glaser	Various Artists
1965	Best Album Cover — Classical		
1965	Saint-Saëns: Carnival of the Animals/Britten: Young Person's Guide to the Orchestra	Robert M. Jones	Arthur Fiedler
1965	Court and Ceremonial Music of the 16th Century	William S. Harvey	Roger Blanchard Ensemble with the Poulteau Consort
1965	Mahler: Symphony No. 5 in C Sharp Minor	Robert M. Jones and David Hect	Erich Leinsdorf
1965	Mexico (Legacy Collection)	Bob Cato	Carlos Chávez
1965	Strauss: Also Sprach Zarathurstra	John Berg	Eugene Ormandy
1965	Verdi: Requiem Mass	Marvin Schwartz	Carlo Maria Giulini
1966	Best Album Cover — Graphic Arts		
1966	Bartók: Concerto No. 2 for Violin/Stravinsky: Concerto for Violin	George Estes	Erich Leinsdorf and Joseph Silverstein
1966	Concert in the Virgin Islands	Ed Thrasher	Duke Ellington
1966	Gould: Spirituals for Orchestra/Copland: Dance Symphony	Georges Estes	Morton Gould
1966	Horowitz at Carnegie Hall — An Historic Return	John Berg	Vladimir Horowitz
1966	Solo Monk	Jerry Smokler	Thelonious Monk
1966	William Tell and Other Favorite Overtures	John Berg	Leonard Bernstein
1966	Best Album Cover — Photography		
1966	Jazz Suite on the Mass Texts	Robert M. Jones and Ken Whitmore	Paul Horn
1966	The Aznavour Story	Ed Thrasher and Sherman Weisburd	Charles Aznavour
1966	Bringing It All Back Home	John Berg and Dan Kramer	Bob Dylan
1966	Guitar Forms	Acy Lehman and Rudolph Regname	Kenny Burrell and the Gil Evans Orchestra
1966	Monk	Jerry Smokler and W. Eugene Smith	Thelonious Monk
1966	My Name Is Barbra	Bob Cato and Sheldon Streisand	Barbra Streisand
1966	Whipped Cream & Other Delights	Peter Whorf	Herb Alpert and the Tijuana Brass
1967	Best Album Cover — Graphic Arts		
1967	Revolver	Klaus Voormann	The Beatles
1967	Baroque Fanfares and Sonatas for Brass	William S. Harvey	Joshua Rifkin
1967	Christmas Carols for Solo Guitar	John Berg and Bob Cato	Charlie Byrd
1967	Color Me Barbra	Barbra Streisand	Charlie Byrd
1967	Ives: Symphony No. 1 in D Minor	Georges Estes	Morton Gould
1967	Stan Kenton Conducts the Los Angeles Neophonic Orchestra	George Osaki	Stan Kenton
1967	Talk That Talk	Woody Woodward	The Jazz Crusaders
1967	Best Album Cover — Photography		
1967	Confessions of a Broken Man	Robert M. Jones and Les Leverette	Porter Wagoner
1967	Blonde on Blonde	John Berg, Bob Cato and Gerald Schatsberg	Bob Dylan
1967	Guantanamera	Peter Whorf	The Sandpipers
1967	Sammy Davis Jr. Sings and Laurindo Almeida Plays	Ed Thrasher and Tom Tucker	Sammy Davis Jr. and Laurindo Almeida
1967	The Time Machine	Robert M. Jones and Tom Zimmerman	Gary Burton
1967	Turn! Turn! Turn!	John Berg, Bob Cato and Guy Webster	The Byrds
1967	What Now My Love	Peter Whorf and George Jerman	Herb Alpert and the Tijuana Brass
1968	Best Album Cover — Graphic Arts		
1968	Sgt. Pepper's Lonely Hearts Club Band	Peter Blake and Jann Haworth	The Beatles
1968	The Gold Standard Collection	Ed Thrasher	Hank Thompson
1968	Haydn: Symphony No. 84 in E Flat Major andSymphony No. 85 in B Flat Major ("La Reine")	John Berg, Bob Cato and Henrietta Condak	Leonard Bernstein conducting the New York Philharmonic
1968	Nashville Cats	Robert M. Jones	Homer and Jethro
1968	Straight, No Chaser	John Berg and Bob Cato	Thelonious Monk
1968	Up, Up and Away	Woody Woodward	The 5th Dimension
1968	Best Album Cover — Photography		
1968	Bob Dylan's Greatest Hits	John Berg, Bob Cato and Roland Scherman	Bob Dylan
1968	Bravo, Bravo, Aznavour	Ken Kim	Charles Aznavour
1968	The Doors	William S. Harvey, Joel Brodsky and Guy Webster	The Doors
1968	Earthwords and Music	Robert M. Jones and New World Photography	John Hartford
1968	From Mexico with Laughs	Robert M. Jones and Howard Cooper	Don Bowman
1968	Suburban Attitudes in Country Verse	Robert M. Jones and Jimmy Moore	John Loudermilk
1968	That Man, Robert Mitchum, Sings	Ken Kim	Robert Mitchum
1969
1969	Underground	John Berg, Richard Mantel and Horn Grinner Studio	Thelonious Monk
1969	Ives: Holiday Symphony	John Berg, Bob Cato and Don Huntstein	Leonard Bernstein
1969	Rhinoceros	William S. Harvey	Rhinoceros
1969	Road Song	Sam Antupit and Pete Turner	Wes Montgomery
1969	Wow	Bob Cato	Moby Grape

=== 1970s ===
Year^{[I]}	Work	Art Director(s)	Performing artist(s)
1970
1970	America the Beautiful	Evelyn J. Kelbish and David Stahlberg	Gary McFarland
1970	Blind Faith	Bob Seidman	Blind Faith
1970	Led Zeppelin II	David Juniper	Led Zeppelin
1970	Pidgeon	Tom Lazarus and Gene Brownell	Pidgeon
1970	Richard Pryor	Gary Burden and Henry Diltz	Richard Pryor
1971
1971	Indianola Mississippi Seeds	Ivan Nagy	B. B. King
1971	Chicago	John Berg and Nick Fasciano	Chicago
1971	Hand Made	Ed Thrasher	Mason Williams
1971	Mason Proffit	Peter Whorf and Christopher Whorf	Mason Proffit
1971	The Naked Carmen	Desmond Strobel	Various Artists
1971	Schubert: "Unfinished" Symphony/Symphony No. 5 (Beethoven)/Beethoven: Fifth Symphony	Peter Whorf and Fred Poore	Artur Rodziński
1971	Uncle Charlie and His Dog Teddy	Woody Woodward and William E. McEuen	Nitty Gritty Dirt Band
1971	The World's Greatest Blues Singer	John Berg	Bessie Smith
1972
1972	Pollution	Gene Brownell and Dean O. Torrence	Pollution
1972	B, S & T; 4	John Berg and Norman Seeff	Blood, Sweat & Tears
1972	Bark	Nick Sangiamo	Jefferson Airplane
1972	Black Pearl	Norman Seeff	Jimmy McGriff
1972	Hot Platters	Ed Thrasher	Various Artists
1972	The Music of Erik Satie: Through a Looking Glass	Vincent J. Biondi	Camarata Contemporary Chamber Orchestra
1972	Sharepickers	Ed Thrasher and Terry Paul	Mason Williams
1972	Sticky Fingers	Andy Warhol	The Rolling Stones
1973
1973	The Siegel-Schwall Band	Acy Lehman	Siegel-Schwall Band
1973	Chief	Aaron Schumake	Dewey Terry
1973	Five Dollar Shoes	Ron Levine	Five Dollar Shoes
1973	Flash	Hipgnosis	Flash
1973	Historical Figures and Ancient Heads	Norman Seeff	Canned Heat
1973	School's Out	Robert Otter	Alice Cooper
1973	Sunset Ride	Ed Thrasher, Christopher Wolf and Dave Willardson	Zephyr
1973	Virgin	Bill Levy and Fred Marcellino	The Mission

=== 2020s ===
Year^{[I]}	Work	Art Director(s)	Performing artist(s)
2026
2026	Chromakopia	Tyler Okonma	Tyler, the Creator
2026	The Crux	Jake Hirshland, Joe Keery, Neil Krug, Taylor Vandergift and William Wesley II	Djo
2026	Debí Tirar Más Fotos	Benito Antonio Martínez Ocasio	Bad Bunny
2026	Glory	Cody Critcheloe, Mike Hadreas and Andrew J.S.	Perfume Genius
2026	Moisturizer	Iris Luz, Lava La Rue and Rhian Teasdale	Wet Leg
2027	God Gotta Afro & Gold Hoops	Patso Dimitrov and Daren Gilliam	Rapsody
2027	Sad and Beautiful World	Lauren N. Bailey, Trevor Hernandez and Elizabeth de la Piedra	Mavis Staples
2027	This Mirror Weighs a Ton	Nick Steinhardt and Addie Wagenknecht	Interpol
2027	West End Girl	Leith Clark and Nieves González	Lily Allen
2027	What Happened to the Streets?	Tina Ibañez	21 Savage
