= Lily Allen Performs West End Girl =

2026 concert tour by Lily Allen

Lily Allen: Performs West End Girl
- Tour by Lily Allen
- Associated album: West End Girl
- Start date: 2 March 2026
- End date: 1 November 2026
- No. of shows: 61

Lily Allen concert chronology
- No Shame Tour (2018–2019); Lily Allen Performs West End Girl (2026)

Lily Allen Performs West End Girl is the ongoing fifth headlining concert tour by British singer-songwriter, Lily Allen, in support of her fifth studio album, West End Girl. The tour was announced on 30 October 2025 with theatre dates across the UK and set to be performed chronologically.

Due to the demand for the theatre dates, in November 2025, Allen announced arena shows had been added to the itinerary. The tour began in March 2026 and will conclude in November of that same year. It is the singer's first tour since the No Shame Tour in 2018.

== Background ==
On 20 October 2025, Allen announced West End Girl and that it would be released four days later. The album was released on 24 October 2025 by her label, BMG.

At first, Allen only announced theatre shows but, due to popular demand, she later announced an arena tour across the United Kingdom and Ireland. On 27 November 2025, Allen added further dates to the tour, including a new date at the O_{2} Arena and one at the AO Arena. In December 2025, she announced a theatre tour across North America. In addition, Australia and New Zealand dates were added in February 2026.

In an interview with Elle, Allen stated she will only sing songs from West End Girl: "don't go expecting a cheeky 'Smile' encore – it's not gonna happen." Allen also said that for the tour, there is no support act. But that fans should get there early as 'something is happening before the show'.

A second North American leg was announced on March 2026, set to take place in larger venues such as Madison Square Garden in New York City and the Greek Theatre in Los Angeles. In July 2026, most of the planned arena shows were replaced with shows at theatres and amphitheatres.

== Set list ==
The following set list was obtained from the concert held on 2 March 2026, at the Royal Concert Hall in Glasgow, Scotland. It is not meant to represent all concerts for the duration of the tour. Instead of a traditional support act, a string orchestra Dallas Minor Trio instead plays songs from Allen's discography with the audience encouraged to sing along.

Dallas Minor Trio

1. "The Fear"
2. "LDN"
3. "Come on Then"
4. "Not Fair"
5. "22"
6. "Alfie"
7. "Who'd Have Known"
8. "Hard Out Here"
9. "Smile"
10. "Fuck You"

West End Girl

1. "West End Girl"
2. "Ruminating"
3. "Sleepwalking"
4. "Tennis"
5. "Madeline"
6. "Relapse"
7. "Pussy Palace"
8. "4chan Stan"
9. "Nonmonogamummy"
10. "Just Enough"
11. "Dallas Major"
12. "Beg For Me"
13. "Let You W/In"
14. "Fruityloop"

== Tour dates ==
List of 2026 concerts, showing date, city, country, and venue
Date	City	Country	Venue
2 March	Glasgow	Scotland	Glasgow Royal Concert Hall
3 March	Liverpool	England	Philharmonic Hall
5 March	Birmingham	England	Symphony Hall
7 March	Sheffield	England	Sheffield City Hall
8 March	Newcastle	England	O_{2} City Hall Newcastle
10 March	Manchester	England	Aviva Studios
11 March	Manchester	England	Aviva Studios
14 March	Nottingham	England	Nottingham Royal Concert Hall
15 March	Cambridge	England	Cambridge Corn Exchange
17 March	Bristol	England	Bristol Beacon
18 March	Cardiff	Wales	New Theatre
20 March	London	England	London Palladium
21 March	London	England	London Palladium
22 March	London	England	London Palladium
3 April	Chicago	United States	Auditorium Theatre
4 April	Chicago	United States	Auditorium Theatre
7 April	Toronto	Canada	Massey Hall
8 April	Toronto	Canada	Massey Hall
11 April	Boston	United States	Orpheum Theatre
12 April	Boston	United States	Orpheum Theatre
14 April	New York City	United States	Radio City Music Hall
15 April	Brooklyn	United States	Kings Theatre
17 April	Philadelphia	United States	The Met Philadelphia
19 April	Washington	United States	Warner Theatre
21 April	Atlanta	United States	Fox Theatre
25 April	Los Angeles	United States	Orpheum Theatre
26 April	Los Angeles	United States	Orpheum Theatre
28 April	San Francisco	United States	The Masonic
16 June	Newcastle	England	Utilita Arena Newcastle
17 June	Glasgow	Scotland	OVO Hydro
19 June	Manchester	England	AO Arena
20 June	Manchester	England	AO Arena
21 June	Leeds	England	First Direct Bank Arena
23 June	Nottingham	England	Motorpoint Arena
24 June	Cardiff	Wales	Utilita Arena Cardiff
26 June	Birmingham	England	bp pulse LIVE
27 June	London	England	The O_{2} Arena
28 June	London	England	The O_{2} Arena
30 June	Dublin	Ireland	3Arena
1 July	Dublin	Ireland	3Arena
7 July	London	England	The O_{2} Arena
3 September	New York City	United States	Madison Square Garden
4 September	Boston	United States	MGM Music Hall at Fenway
6 September	Philadelphia	United States	TD Pavilion at Highmark Mann (Note: Originally scheduled to take place at Xfinity Mobile Arena. For this show, tickets are to be completely refunded and ticket holders will be required to buy new tickets after being automatically entered into a presale.)
10 September	Toronto	Canada	RBC Amphitheatre
12 September	Detroit	United States	Fox Theatre
13 September	Chicago	United States	Chicago Theatre (Note: Originally scheduled to take place at the United Center. For this show, tickets are to be completely refunded and ticket holders will be required to buy new tickets after being automatically entered into a presale.)
16 September	Minneapolis	United States	The Armory
18 September	Morrison	United States	Red Rocks Amphitheatre
21 September	Los Angeles	United States	Greek Theatre (Note: Originally scheduled to take place on September 25 at the Kia Forum in Inglewood. For this show, tickets are to be completely refunded and ticket holders will be required to buy new tickets after being automatically entered into a presale.)
22 September	Oakland	United States	Paramount Theatre (Note: Originally scheduled to take place on September 23 at the Chase Center in San Francisco. For this show, tickets are to be completely refunded and ticket holders will be required to buy new tickets after being automatically entered into a presale.)
24 September	Seattle	United States	Paramount Theatre
28 September	Vancouver	Canada	The Orpheum (Note: Originally scheduled to take place on September 21 at Rogers Arena. For this show, tickets are to be completely refunded and ticket holders will be required to buy new tickets after being automatically entered into a presale.)
23 October	Brisbane	Australia	Brisbane Entertainment Centre
25 October	Sydney	Australia	TikTok Entertainment Centre
26 October	Sydney	Australia	TikTok Entertainment Centre
28 October	Melbourne	Australia	Rod Laver Arena
29 October	Melbourne	Australia	Rod Laver Arena
1 November	Perth	Australia	RAC Arena

=== Cancelled dates ===
List of cancelled concerts
Date	City	Country	Venue	Reason
8 September	Montreal	Canada	Bell Centre	Low ticket sales
21 October	Auckland	New Zealand	Spark Arena	Illness (viral infection)

== Reception ==
The tour attracted some criticism online, with fans complaining about the length of Allen's set (~55 minutes), the absence of a full support act, and the lack of engagement with the audience. Allen defended herself on social media, stating that not talking to the crowd was an "artistic choice".
