= If the World Just Danced =

Single by Diana Ross

from the album Thank You
- Released: September 3, 2021
- Genre: House-pop
- Length: 3:44
- Label: Decca
- Songwriters: Diana Ross; Aliandro Prawl; Andre Pinckney; Scott M. Carter; Amy Wadge; Vanessa Wood; Jaquetta Singleton
- Producers: Triangle Park; Scott M. Carter

Diana Ross singles chronology
"Thank You" (2021)	"If the World Just Danced" (2021)	"All Is Well" (2021)

Music video
- "If the World Just Danced" on YouTube

"If the World Just Danced" is a song recorded by American singer Diana Ross for her twenty-fifth studio album Thank You (2021). It was released on September 3, 2021 by Decca Records as the second single from the album.

== Music video ==
The official music video was released on October 19, 2021. The video was created based on several dozen videos collected by Ross fans around the world. Imagining what it would be like "if the world just danced", fans sent dozens of videos to TikTok with the tag #IfTheWorldJustDanced.

== Critical reception ==
The song received mostly negative reviews. Alexis Petridis of The Guardian called the song "a frightful bit anaemic pop-house", which, in his opinion, "is so humiliating for Diana Ross that she probably had to wear a diving helmet during the recording". Reviewer Alex Jeffrey of musicOMH also gave a negative assessment of the single, which he believes is "more than half about what Ross' gay audience might want from her today." He noted that "there is no clear chorus in the song, and she herself is too disembodied to gain a foothold in the Billboard dance charts." Nevertheless, he noted Ross's voice, "most of which has changed with age, and fits comfortably into the good-natured dance atmosphere without trying too hard to be spectacular". Steve Govoritz of PopMatters wrote that "the song seems static and tired, despite the dance rhythms", and although "Ross carefully pronounces the words, but she does not put feelings into them".

== Track listing ==
Digital download and streaming

1. "If the World Just Danced" – 3:44

Digital download and streaming

1. "If the World Just Danced" (Eric Kupper Remix) – 3:52

Digital download and streaming

1. "If the World Just Danced" (MOTi Remix) – 3:29

== Charts ==
Chart performance for "If the World Just Danced"
Chart (2021)	Peak position
UK Singles Downloads (Official Charts)	56
UK Singles Sales (OCC)	57
