= No Shame Tour =

2018–19 concert tour by Lily Allen

- Tour by Lily Allen
- Associated album: No Shame
- Start date: 5 October 2018
- End date: 17 August 2019
- No. of shows: 22 in North America; 16 in Europe; 8 in Oceania; 1 in South America; 47 in total

Lily Allen concert chronology
- Sheezus Tour (2014–15); No Shame Tour (2018–19); Lily Allen Performs West End Girl (2026)

The No Shame Tour was the fourth headlining tour by English singer Lily Allen, in support of her fourth studio album, No Shame (2018). The tour started on 5 October 2018 in Santa Ana, and concluded on 17 August 2019 in Dublin.

In comparison with Allen's tour for Sheezus (2014), the tour is a smaller production, with Allen and two other people onstage. The setlist mainly comprises songs from No Shame but also includes older music by Allen, such as "Fuck You", "Smile" and "LDN".

The opening act for North America and Europe was Wolverhampton born artist, S-X.

== Set list ==
This set list is from the show on 13 October 2018 in Houston. It is not intended to represent all concerts for the tour.

1. "Come on Then"
2. "Waste"
3. "LDN"
4. "My One"
5. "What You Waiting For?"
6. "Knock 'Em Out"
7. "Lost My Mind"
8. "Smile"
9. "Party Line" (unreleased song)
10. "I'm Always on a Mountain When I Fall" (Merle Haggard cover)
11. "deep end" (Lykke Li cover)
12. "Pushing Up Daises"
13. "Three"
14. "Everything to Feel Something"
15. "The Fear"
16. "Higher"
17. "Family Man"
18. "Who'd Have Known"
19. "Not Fair"

Encore

20. "Apples"
21. "Trigger Bang"
22. "Fuck You"

== Tour dates ==
List of concerts, showing date, city, country, venue, tickets sold, number of available tickets and amount of gross revenue
Date	City	Country	Venue
North America
5 October 2018	Santa Ana	United States	The Observatory
6 October 2018	Oakland	United States	Fox Oakland Theatre
7 October 2018	Los Angeles	United States	Fonda Theatre
10 October 2018	Tempe	United States	Marquee Theatre
12 October 2018 (Note: This concert is part of Austin City Limits Music Festival.)	Austin	United States	Zilker Park
13 October 2018	Houston	United States	House of Blues
14 October 2018	Dallas	United States	House of Blues
16 October 2018	New Orleans	United States	House of Blues
17 October 2018	Atlanta	United States	Buckhead Theatre
18 October 2018	Nashville	United States	Cannery Ballroom
20 October 2018	New York City	United States	Terminal 5
21 October 2018	Silver Spring	United States	The Fillmore Silver Spring
23 October 2018	Philadelphia	United States	Union Transfer
24 October 2018	Boston	United States	Paradise Rock Club
27 October 2018	Montreal	Canada	Corona Theatre
28 October 2018	Toronto	Canada	Phoenix Concert Theatre
30 October 2018	Detroit	United States	St. Andrew's Hall
3 November 2018	Denver	United States	Summit
6 November 2018	Portland	United States	Roseland Theater
8 November 2018	Seattle	United States	The Showbox
9 November 2018	Vancouver	Canada	Vogue Theatre
Europe
1 December 2018	Zurich	Switzerland	Komplex 457
2 December 2018 (Note: The show in Milan, Italy was initially planned at the Fabrique. On 27 November the organizer, Vivo Concerti, has announced that the show was moved to the Circolo Magnolia.)	Milan	Italy	Circolo Magnolia
4 December 2018	Berlin	Germany	Astra Berlin
5 December 2018	Brussels	Belgium	Ancienne Belgique
6 December 2018	Cologne	Germany	Live Music Hall
8 December 2018	Paris	France	Le Trianon
9 December 2018	Utrecht	Netherlands	Ronda at Tivoli
11 December 2018	Dublin	Ireland	Olympia Theatre
13 December 2018	Glasgow	Scotland	Barrowland Ballroom
14 December 2018	Birmingham	England	O_{2} Institute
16 December 2018	Manchester	England	Albert Hall
17 December 2018	London	England	The Roundhouse
18 December 2018	London	England	The Roundhouse
Oceania
2 February 2019	Auckland	New Zealand	Spark Arena
4 February 2019	Sydney	Australia	Enmore Theatre
5 February 2019	Sydney	Australia	Enmore Theatre
6 February 2019	Melbourne	Australia	Forum Theatre
8 February 2019	Brisbane	Australia	The Tivoli
9 February 2019 (Note: This concert is part of Party In The Paddock festival.)	Launceston	Australia	White Hills
10 February 2019	Melbourne	Australia	Forum Theatre
12 February 2019	Perth	Australia	Metro City
Europe
25 May 2019 (Note: This concert is part of Love Saves The Day 2019.)	Bristol	England	Eastville Park
North America
2 June 2019 (Note: This concert is part of Governors Ball.)	New York City	United States	Randalls Island
South America
9 June 2019 (Note: This concert is part of Cultura Inglesa Festival.)	São Paulo	Brazil	Memorial da América Latina
Europe
14 June 2019 (Note: This concert is part of Isle of Wight Festival.)	Newport	England	Seaclose Park
17 August 2019 (Note: This concert is part of Love Sensation Festival.)	Dublin	Ireland	Royal Hospital Kilmainham

== Cancelled shows ==
List of cancelled concerts, showing date, city, country, venue and reason for cancellation
Date	City	Country	Venue	Reason
31 October 2018	Chicago	United States	The Vic Theatre	Illness.
1 November 2018	Minneapolis	United States	Varsity Theatre	Illness.
4 November 2018	Salt Lake City	United States	The Complex	Illness.
