= Andrea Rocca =

Italian musician

- Born: June 9, 1969 (age 57); Rome
- Genres: Punk, alt rock, avant garde
- Website: www.andrearocca.com

Andrea Rocca (born 9 June 1969, in Rome) is an Italian musician, guitarist and film composer.

Rocca moved to London in 1988, where he trained with John White and graduated in ethnomusicology at the School of Oriental and African Studies in 1997. He studied classical guitar as a child but eventually lost interest and by his late teens was planning to become a reporter and war photographer. Discovering the electric guitar reignited his interest in music, and he was soon composing and recording pieces inspired by musicians including Frank Zappa, Bill Harkleroad, Marc Moreland and Derek Bailey. He quickly developed an interest in punk and alternative rock, and the music of avant-garde bands such as the Residents together with the work of classical and jazz composers like Edgar Varèse, John White, Ornette Coleman, Charles Mingus and Sun Ra. He began scoring feature-length films in 1995, with Kaprice Kea's The Hurting.

His work alternates between scoring, dance and theatre commissions, and live performance. He is involved with several bands in London's avant-garde music scene.

== Selected filmography ==
- La Città Ideale (English: The Ideal City) (2012)
- Liberi (English: Break Free) (2003)
- Tre mogli (English: Three Wives) (2001)
- Branchie (1999)
- L'Ultimo capodanno dell'umanita' (English: Humanity's Last New Year's Eve) (1998)
- The Hurting (1995)
