= Pussy Palace =

Song by Lily Allen

from the album West End Girl
- Released: 24 October 2025
- Length: 4:01
- Label: BMG
- Songwriters: Lily Allen; Blue May; Leroy Clampitt; Chloe Angelides
- Producers: Blue May; Leroy Clampitt

Visualiser
- "Pussy Palace" on YouTube

"Pussy Palace" is a song by English musician Lily Allen. Released as part of her fifth album, West End Girl, the track describes an incident where she discovered sex toys, personal lubricant, and hundreds of Trojan condoms at an ex-husband's West Village apartment. It peaked at number eight on the UK singles chart, becoming Allen's first top ten song on that chart since 2014, and received positive critical reception.

== History ==
"Pussy Palace" was recorded for West End Girl, Allen's fifth album and her first since 2018. West End Girl was written and recorded in Los Angeles in 10 days during December 2024 during the immediate aftermath of her split with her husband, the actor David Harbour. A blend of fiction and non-fiction, the album is generally regarded as being inspired by the break-up, though does not mention Harbour by name. The album was executive produced by Allen, Seb Chew, Kito, and Blue May. Allen wrote "Pussy Palace" with Leroy Clampitt, May, and Chloe Angelides. The instrumental was made on a 1974 Minimoog and took 20 minutes to write, while the lyrics started with the idea of a West Village apartment and took 90 minutes to write.

During the song, she sings about throwing a partner out and travelling to West Village to deliver letters and medication to his apartment. Her journey is interrupted by delays on the F train in New York. There, having been disconcerted by the apartment's atmosphere, she discovers a bedroom with bed sheets on the floor, long black hair, a shoebox full of handwritten letters from "heartbroken women" wishing that her ex could have "been better", and a Duane Reade bag with tied handles containing sex toys, hundreds of Trojan condoms, and personal lubricant. Her discoveries lead Allen to wonder if her partner was a sex addict.

"Pussy Palace" was released as the seventh track of fourteen tracks released as part of West End Girl and its focus track. The album was released on 24 October 2025 on BMG. A visualiser was released for the song featuring Allen dressed as a nun in stilettos. In reference to the song, USBs in the shape of blue polkadot butt plugs were loaded with the album and handed out at its release party. From December, Allen sold the album in butt plug form via her website. Upon release, many fans opined that the introduction resembled the theme tune of Stranger Things, a series Harbour had been in.

Reviewing the album, Chloe Craft of Hot Press wrote that the song "boasts an earworm chorus and memorable verses over crashing drums, the lot set to a danceable beat and delivered via a marvellous, synth-led production". Chris Willman of Variety described the chorus as "the kind of earworm you may spend the fall singing out loud" and The Guardian, the Evening Standard, The New Yorker, and The Independent all commented on its catchiness. The song peaked at number eight on the UK singles chart, becoming Allen's first top ten single on that chart since 2014.

== Credits and personnel ==
Credits adapted from Tidal.

- Lily Allen – vocals, lyrics, composition, production
- Blue May – lyrics, composition, production, bass, engineering, keyboards, programming, synthesizer
- Kito – production
- Leroy Clampitt – lyrics, composition, production, drums, engineering, guitar, keyboards, programming, synthesizer
- Seb Chew – production
- Chloe Angelides – lyrics, composition, backing vocals
- Ben Baptie – engineering
- Joe LaPorta – engineering

== Charts and accolades ==
Weekly chart performance for "Pussy Palace"
Chart (2025)	Peak position
Australia (ARIA)	50
Belgium (Ultratop 50 Flanders)	43
Ireland (IRMA)	9
New Zealand Hot Singles (RMNZ)	1
Sweden Heatseeker (Sverigetopplistan)	8
UK Singles (Official Charts)	8
UK Indie (Official Charts)	2

Year-end lists
Publication	List	Rank	Ref.
Consequence	The 200 Best Songs of 2025	42	
DIY	DIY's 2025 Tracks of the Year	10	
Entertainment Weekly	The 10 Best Songs of 2025	7	
The Guardian	The 20 Best Songs of 2025	8	
The Independent	The Independent's Favourite Songs of 2025	—N/a	
NME	The 50 Best Songs of 2025	21	
Rough Trade	The Best Songs of 2025	—N/a	
Variety	The Best Songs of 2025	—N/a	
