= Madeline (Lily Allen song) =

Single by Lily Allen

from the album West End Girl
- Released: 31 October 2025
- Genre: Alternative pop
- Length: 2:55
- Label: BMG
- Songwriters: Lily Allen; Blue May; Chaz Eugene Carter; Jeremy Melvin; Violet Skies
- Producers: Lily Allen; Blue May; Chrome Sparks; Kito; Micha Jasper; Seb Chew

Lily Allen singles chronology
"Lost My Mind" (2018)	"Madeline" (2025)	"Beg For Me" (2026)

Music video
- "Madeline" on YouTube

"Madeline" is a song by English musician Lily Allen. The song was released as the first single from Allen's fifth studio album, West End Girl. The song peaked at No. 16 on the UK singles chart. It is her first official single release since "Lost My Mind" in 2018.

Released as a single on Halloween, Allen dressed for the holiday as Madeline of the eponymous children's media series, following jokes comparing the character and the song's subject.

== Composition ==
"Madeline" is a country-inspired song featuring flamenco-style guitar. In the track, Allen sings about confronting the woman her husband is having an affair with over text, specifically asking whether it is a purely sexual relationship or whether the pair have an emotional connection. The song follows on chronologically from the track "Tennis" on the album, during which Allen finds messages on her husband's phone to Madeline. Allen stated in interviews that Madeline is a fictional character who is a "construct of others".

The song features elements of Neil Diamond's "Girl, You'll Be a Woman Soon" (1967), namely the chord structure and sections of vocal melody.

== Promotion ==
Allen performed "Madeline" on an episode of the fifty-first season of Saturday Night Live that was hosted by Josh O'Connor and aired on 13 December 2025. American actress Dakota Johnson joined Allen on stage, portraying the character of Madeline during the spoken word sections of the song. Allen also performed album track "Sleepwalking" during the episode.

== Credits and personnel ==
Credits adapted from Tidal.

- Lily Allen – vocals, lyrics, composition, production
- Blue May – lyrics, composition, production, bass, drums, engineering, guitar, piano, programming
- Chrome Sparks – production, drums, engineering, guitar, programming, synthesizer
- Kito – production
- Micah Jasper – production, programming
- Seb Chew – production
- Chaz Eugene Carter – lyrics, composition
- Jeremy Malvin – lyrics, composition
- Violet Skies – lyrics, composition, additional production
- Leon Vynehall – additional production
- Alex Marshall – cello
- Jess cox – cello
- Klara Romac – cello
- Rhian Porter – cello
- Vicky Matthews – cello
- Amy Langley – conducting, strings arranger
- Ben Baptie – engineering
- Joe LaPorta – engineering
- Amy Standford – viola
- Jordan Bergmans – viola
- Polly Wiltshire – viola
- Sarah Chapman – viola
- Blaize Henry – violin
- Ellie Standford – violin
- Gita Langley – violin
- Glezni Roberts – violin
- Honor Watson – violin
- Jessie Murphy – violin
- Kotono Sato – violin
- Martin Lissola – violin
- Paloma Deike – violin
- Sarah Sexton – violin
- Stephanie Benedetti – violin

== Charts ==
=== Weekly charts ===
Weekly chart performance
Chart (2025)	Peak position
Australia (ARIA)	98
Estonia Airplay (TopHit)	80
Ireland (IRMA)	26
New Zealand Hot Singles (RMNZ)	5
UK Singles (OCC)	16
UK Indie (OCC)	4

=== Monthly charts ===
Monthly chart performance
Chart (2025)	Peak position
Estonia Airplay (TopHit)	94
