= West End Girl =

Studio album by Lily Allen
- Released: 24 October 2025
- Recorded: December 2024; February 2025
- Genre: Pop
- Length: 44:46
- Label: BMG
- Producers: Lily Allen; Alessandro Buccellati; Seb Chew; Leroy Clampitt; Chrome Sparks; Jason Evigan; Micah Jasper; Kito; Blue May; Oscar Scheller; Leon Vynehall

Lily Allen chronology
No Shame (2018)	West End Girl (2025)

Singles from West End Girl
- 1. "Madeline" Released: 31 October 2025; 2. "Beg for Me" Released: 29 May 2026

West End Girl is the fifth studio album by English singer-songwriter Lily Allen. The album was released on 24 October 2025, through BMG. It marks her first project in seven years and her first album following her departure from Parlophone. West End Girl was primarily recorded in Los Angeles over ten days in December 2024, with additional production taking place in February 2025. The album was mainly written by Allen, who also co-produced the project alongside Seb Chew, Kito and Blue May, among others.

Primarily a pop album, with influences of electronic, R&B and garage, West End Girl lyrically reflects on the undoing of Allen's marriage to actor David Harbour, how she processed his alleged acts of infidelity, and her emotional response. Upon its release, West End Girl received acclaim from music critics, many of whom described it as lyrically honest and praised its narrative. It was named as one of the best albums of 2025 by several publications and was nominated for British Album of the Year at the Brit Awards 2026. At the 69th Annual Grammy Awards, the album's artwork was nominated for Best Album Cover.

Commercially, the album peaked at number two on the UK Albums Chart, where it was certified Gold for moving 100,000 units, and reached the top ten in Australia, Ireland, and New Zealand. The album's lead single, "Madeline", reached the top twenty on the UK Singles Chart, while the album track "Pussy Palace" peaked at number eight, becoming Allen's first top ten in the UK since 2014. To promote the album, Allen embarked on a concert tour, Lily Allen Performs West End Girl, which commenced in March 2026.

== Background ==
Following the release of No Shame (2018), Allen met and married the actor David Harbour and moved to Brooklyn. She ventured away from music into other endeavours including stage acting, starring in the West End production 2:22 A Ghost Story (2021) and screen acting in Dreamland (2023). Allen also launched the popular podcast Miss Me with Miquita Oliver. In April 2019, Allen stated on Beats 1 radio that she was working on her next album, describing it as a concept album. She later revealed in March 2020 that her new album features "odd mentions" of her past addictions, stating "This album I've been doing, I've been writing for just over a year, but I feel like I've moved on mentally so far from that time."

Following a significant hiatus, Allen began writing consistently again in 2020, but suffered from writer's block, and felt dissatisfied with what she was creating. In 2022, Allen recruited producer Blue May. The collaboration was described as a "complete failure" by the latter. During a two-month period in New York, the pair reportedly "barely wrote one song", with May noting that Allen was often absent from the studio. Allen said of the five weeks in a music studio she had booked, that it felt "contrived" and that the music was not ready to be released. In early 2024, she said she had recorded around fifty songs for her next music project, which she was still working on. In the summer of 2024, Allen met May once more in Los Angeles, where she shared details about her personal life and discussed her interest in beginning writing and working with him again. Shortly after this, they met to start work on the album and schedule recording time.

== Writing and recording ==
West End Girl was created and recorded over a ten-day period at Blue May's home in Los Angeles. Unlike her previous work, which often featured one main producer, Allen wanted to include additional writers and producers in the album's creation. Allen and May put together a team of writers, producers, and players that would come and go from the studio over the course of the ten days. Co-executive producer, Kito, along with Allen and May, produced all the album's tracks, whilst Allen collaborated on the songwriting with Hayley Gene Penner, Chloe Angelides, and Violet Skies. On the first day of recording, Allen presented eighteen song titles and a vision for a chronological album. "Just Enough" was the first song to be written for the album, and was completed within three hours. The song was inspired by the Elvis Presley song, "Can't Help Falling in Love" (1961), and written by Allen as she was sharing her relationship details with May, Kito, and Angelides. That same day, the group completed writing and recording "Tennis".

Welsh songwriter Violet Skies joined the group in the studio for four days and co-wrote six of the albums songs: "Madeline", "Sleepwalking", "Let You W/in", "Dallas Major", "Relapse", and "Beg for Me". Skies described the process as playing "tennis" with Allen, in which they would go back and forth on potential lyrics, or Allen would write streams of thought that the two would then organise. "Madeline" and "Relapse" were written on the same day, the latter being completed during an evening studio session. The structure of "Madeline" was inspired by Dolly Parton's single "Jolene" (1973) and a story Allen shared about an email exchange she had with a woman. Additionally, during the writing of "Madeline", Allen put on an American accent and impersonated said woman, which was used on the final track. Fourteen out of the eighteen track titles Allen brought on the first day were completed by the end of the ten days. Allen and May agreed to return to the studio in February, for six days, to complete the four remaining titles. May invited along two new collaborators; Hayley Gene Penner and Alessandro Buccellati, to work with Allen. When the group met in February, they completed the album's opening track, "West End Girl", and "Ruminating", with the remaining songs being scrapped.

May wanted to use the album's production to convey the lyrics emotional quality and storytelling. The album's tracks, such as "Tennis", utilise a mellow soul music backdrop to depict a domestic scene, while "Madeline" incorporates explicit sound effects, such as gun sounds, to represent a dramatic scene. The production of tracks such as "Dallas Major" attempted to capture the feeling of a '90s New York club through incorporating disco music influences, reflecting the song's lyrics which see Allen make the decision to re-enter the dating scene. For songs focused on internal states, such as "Ruminating," the sound design intensifies emotion; using a sped-up, looping drumbeat from a Korg Triton keyboard to mimic the obsessive thought process of Allen receiving difficult news.

== Composition ==
A predominantly pop album, West End Girl incorporates an eclectic mix of genres including dancehall, electronic, R&B, 2-step garage, and Latin pop. Alexis Petridis of The Guardian noted that the album's story ties the songs and mix of sounds together. West End Girl was noted for its narrative arc and song cycle format. Allen stated that the lyrics draw on real experiences from her marriage, but that the album "could be considered autofiction" and that she used "artistic licence". For instance, she described Madeline, who appears in two songs, as a fictional character who is a construct of others.

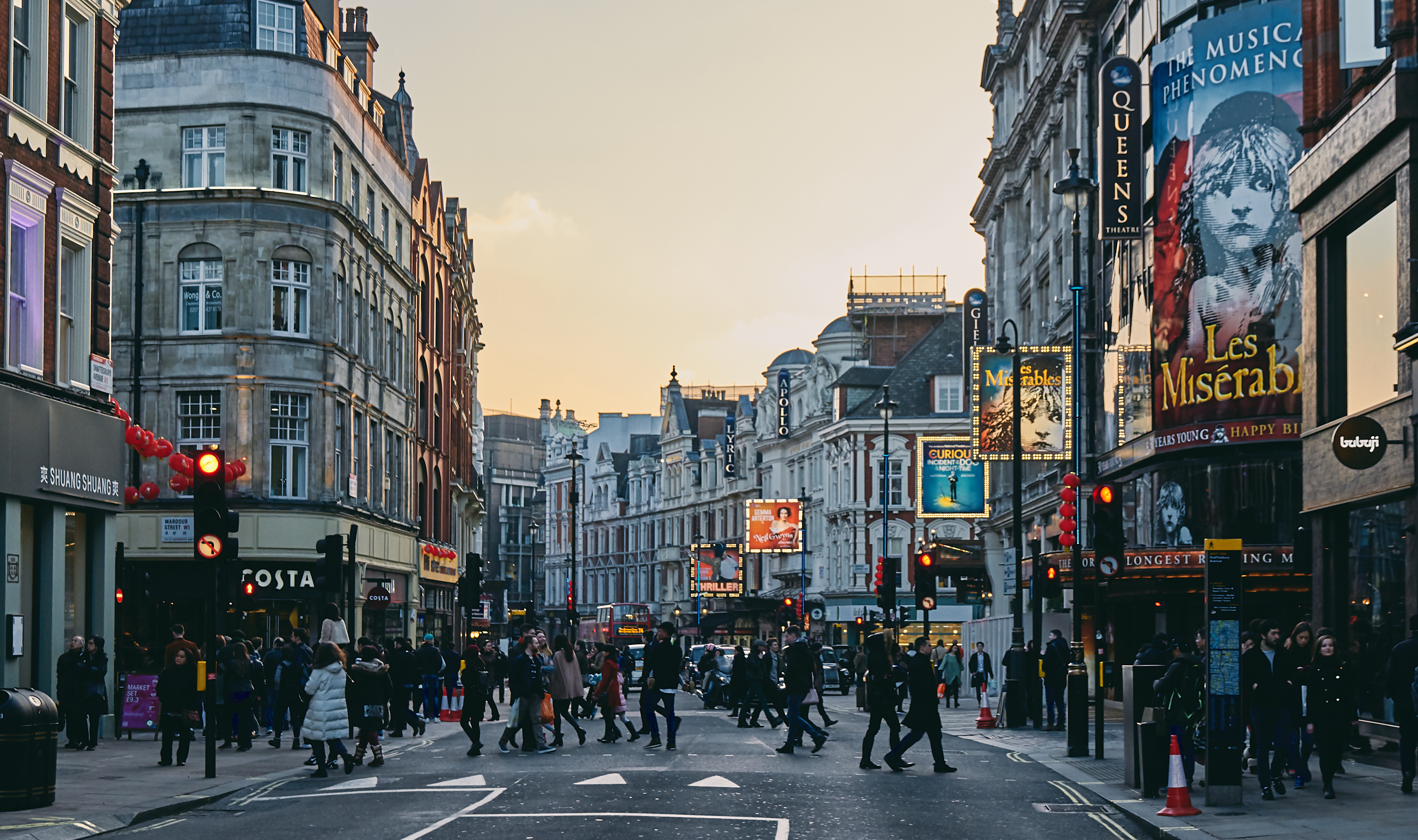
The album title and opening track reference Allen's time acting on the West End (pictured) in London.

The title track opens the album and features "dreamy, musical theatre-inspired" production. It tells the story of Allen moving to New York following her wedding and flying back to the UK after getting a role in a London play. At the end of the song, she receives a phone call with only her side of the conversation audible, reluctantly agreeing to her husband's request for an open marriage. "Ruminating" is built over "trebly synths" and heavily auto-tuned vocals, with lyrics about overthinking. The 1950s music-inspired "Sleepwalking" discusses feeling trapped and gaslit in a relationship.

In "Tennis", Allen attempts to have a normal meal with her family until she finds a text on her husband's phone from a woman named Madeline and repeatedly demands to know who she is. It is followed by "Madeline", a song with flamenco and spaghetti Western influences. Earning comparisons to Dolly Parton's "Jolene", it finds Allen confronting her husband's mistress, who responds with platitudes in a Valley girl accent. "Relapse" draws on 2-step garage. It details Allen's struggle with maintaining her sobriety amidst her marriage difficulties over an "arrhythmic beat". "Pussy Palace" sees her throwing her husband out of the marital home and sending him away to his separate apartment, which she assumed was a dojo. When she goes there to leave something for him, she instead discovers numerous items such as sex toys and hundreds of condoms that lead her to question whether he is a sex addict.

In "4chan Stan", Allen mocks her husband with references to the imageboard website 4chan over "wistful" production. "Nonmonogamummy", a dancehall-infused collaboration with Specialist Moss, discusses dating as a woman in her late thirties and people pleasing. The ballad "Just Enough", with "lush strings" inspired by old Hollywood, finds Allen wondering whether her husband fathered a child with another woman. In the soul-pop "Dallas Major", she assumes the name on a dating app but dislikes the experience. "Beg for Me" uses a slowed down sample of Lumidee's song "Never Leave You (Uh Oooh, Uh Oooh)". Its lyrics detail what Allen wants in a relationship. "Let You W/In" discusses the end of her marriage with a "no-nonsense" attitude. In the closing track, "Fruityloop", Allen makes tentative peace with the events described on West End Girl with a reference to her second album, It's Not Me, It's You (2009).

== Artwork ==
The album cover and illustrations were created by Spanish artist Nieves González. González was inspired specifically by 16th and 17th century paintings, notably iconography of saints and martyrs, which Laura Martin of Esquire noted for being similar to the work of 17th-century Dutch artist Rembrandt. Leith Clark, the creative director of the album, contacted González after seeing her works on Instagram. The team aimed for a classical-styled cover featuring contemporary elements; therefore, the jacket and the polka dots were utilised as key features. In March 2026, Allen loaned the cover painting to the National Portrait Gallery, London, where it was to be displayed for a year. The artwork was nominated for Best Album Cover at the 69th Annual Grammy Awards.

== Release and promotion ==
On 20 October 2025, Allen announced that her fifth studio album, West End Girl, would be released four days later. West End Girl was released for streaming on 24 October 2025, on BMG, Allen's first album in seven years and her first release outside Parlophone, her old label. West End Girl was released in physical formats on 30 January 2026; the release included CDs, polka dot vinyl LPs, and a limited-edition USB flash drive designed as a butt plug.

Following its release, West End Girl and its personal content generated significant discussion online. The online conversation led some social media users to criticise Harbour, and call for a boycott of his show Stranger Things. Internet users analysed the former couple's content, including their Architectural Digest home tour, notes Allen had received from Harbour, and investigated Allen's past statements about infidelity inspiring her earlier album, No Shame. Streams of the album doubled in its first week of release, and discoveries of Allen on Spotify reached 100,000 a day, which The Hollywood Reporter noted was due to the online interest.

Upon the album's release, three of its tracks, "Pussy Palace", "West End Girl", and "Madeline", charted within the top twenty of the UK singles chart, with "Pussy Palace" subsequently becoming Allen's first top 10 since "Air Balloon" (2014). "Madeline" was serviced as the album's first single to British radio a week after its release. On 13 December 2025, Allen performed "Madeline" on an episode of the fifty-first season Saturday Night Live. Actress Dakota Johnson joined Allen on stage, portraying the character of Madeline during the spoken word sections of the song. Allen also performed album track "Sleepwalking" during the episode.

To further promote West End Girl, Allen embarked on her fifth concert tour, Lily Allen Performs West End Girl, in March 2026, having announced it on 30 October 2025. The tour will take place in theatres across the United Kingdom including the London Palladium, and is set to be performed chronologically. Due to high demand, in November 2025, a second leg was added to the tour for June 2026, performed at arena venues including The O2.

On 29 May 2026, Allen released a remix of "Beg for Me" featuring new lyrics and vocals from Jade as the album's second single. Allen and Jade debuted the remix live during Allen's headlining set at Mighty Hoopla on 30 May.

== Critical reception ==
Professional ratings
Aggregate scores
Source	Rating
AnyDecentMusic?	7.8/10
Metacritic	84/100
Review scores
Source	Rating
AllMusic	3.5/5 stars
Clash	8/10
The Daily Telegraph	4/5 stars
The Guardian	4/5 stars
The Independent	5/5 stars
The Line of Best Fit	8/10
musicOMH	5/5 stars
NME	4/5 stars
Pitchfork	7.3/10
Rolling Stone	4/5 stars

According to the review aggregator Metacritic, West End Girl received "universal acclaim" based on a weighted average score of 84 out of 100 from eighteen critic scores. The review aggregator AnyDecentMusic? gave it a weighted average score of 7.8 out of 10 from eighteen critic scores.

In a five-star review for The Independent, Hannah Ewens said West End Girl was "a brutal, tell-all masterpiece", naming it as her best work since It's Not Me, It's You. Ewens said that the "intense story-driven format lets her sound sharper, smarter, and more clear-eyed than before". Ewens contrasted the album to other divorce albums like Beyoncé's Lemonade (2016) and Adele's 30 (2021), arguing that its fast turnaround allowed Allen to seize control of her narrative and hold little back. Ali Shutler of NME hailed the album as "a vicious, vulnerable and victorious comeback". Shutler said that "there's a lot of grief and misery across West End Girl, but it never sounds depressing", attributing it to Allen's long-held "knack for making devastation sound exciting".

Writing in The Guardian, Alexis Petridis noted the album's "boldness, and the quality of its songwriting" as well as "the striking prettiness of its tunes", calling West End Girl "a divorce album like no other" which "would be a great pop album regardless of the subject matter". However, Petridis added that "there are moments when you find yourself wondering if airing this much dirty laundry can possibly be a good idea, impeccably written and laced with mordant wit though the lyrics are".

=== Rankings ===
The Economist included West End Girl in their list of the ten best albums of 2025, with the comments: "A divorce album that does not hide behind metaphor or euphemism. Instead, Lily Allen outlines various betrayals and deceptions in detail (inspired by her ex-husband, David Harbour). This is the rawest record of the year by some distance—and a truly compelling listen." Rolling Stone included West End Girl on their list of 100 best albums of 2025, noting, "Here we find Allen, nearly 20 years after her debut, Alright, Still, delivering her most ruthless music yet, an odyssey of betrayal and heartbreak, a work where musical storytelling is laid out in its barest and sharpest form."

Year-end lists
Publication	List	Rank	Ref.
The Atlantic	The 10 Best Albums of 2025	6	
Beats Per Minute	Top 50 Albums of 2025	34	
Billboard	The 50 Best Albums of 2025	12	
DIY	DIY's 2025 Albums of the Year	4	
The Economist	The 10 Best Albums of 2025	—N/a	
Exclaim!	Exclaim!'s 50 Best Albums of 2025	36	
The Fader	The 50 Best Albums of 2025	6	
The Guardian	The 50 Best Albums of 2025	7	
Harper's Bazaar	The 12 Best Albums of 2025	4	
The Independent	The 20 Best Albums of 2025	3	
The Line of Best Fit	The Best Albums of 2025	49	
Los Angeles Times	The 25 Best Albums of 2025	21	
Nialler9	The 50 Best Albums of 2025	20	
NME	The 50 Best Albums of 2025	13	
PopMatters	The 80 Best Albums of 2025	61	
PopMatters	The 25 Best Pop Albums of 2025	10	
Rolling Stone	The 100 Best Albums of 2025	33	
Rolling Stone UK	25 Best Albums of 2025	—N/a	
The Skinny	The Skinny's Albums of 2025	3	
The Sunday Times	The 25 Best Albums of 2025	5	
Time Out	The 25 Best Albums of 2025	11	
Us Weekly	The Best Albums of 2025	—N/a	
Variety	The Best Albums of 2025	—N/a	
Vogue	The 45 Best Albums of 2025	—N/a	

=== Industry awards ===
Awards and nominations for West End Girl
Organization	Year	Category	Result	Ref.
Brit Awards	2026	Album of the Year	Nominated	
Grammy Awards	2027	Best Album Cover	Pending	
Ivor Novello Awards	2026	Best Album	Nominated	

== Commercial performance ==
In the United Kingdom, West End Girl debuted at number four on the UK Albums Chart on downloads alone with physical copies not available until January 2026. It was her highest-charting album in eleven years. It was the most streamed digital-only release by a British artist in 2025 in its opening week and was also the country's most-downloaded album that week, debuting at number one on the Official Albums Downloads Chart. The album climbed to number two on the UK charts the following week, remaining the most streamed album of the week. Following the album's physical release, it rose 92 spots on the UK Albums Chart, returning to its peak position. The same week, West End Girl topped the Official Vinyl Albums Chart.

== Track listing ==
No.	Title	Lyrics	Music	Producer(s)	Length
1.	"West End Girl"	Lily Allen; Hayley Gene Penner	Allen; Penner; Alessandro Buccellati; Blue May	Allen; Buccellati; May^{[p]}; Kito; Seb Chew; Penner^{[a]}; Leon Vynehall^{[a]}; Leroy Clampitt^{[v]}	4:06
2.	"Ruminating"	Allen; Penner	Allen; Buccellati; May; Penner	Allen; Buccellati^{[p]}; May^{[p]}; Kito; Chew; Micah Jasper; Oscar Scheller; Penner^{[a]}; Vynehall^{[a]}; Chloe Angelides^{[a]}	3:26
3.	"Sleepwalking"	Allen; Violet Skies	Allen; Skies; Leroy Clampitt; Maaike Kito Lebbing; May	Allen; May; Kito; Chew; Clampitt^{[p]}; Scheller^{[a]}; Violet Skies^{[a]}	2:57
4.	"Tennis"	Allen; Angelides	Allen; Angelides; Lebbing	Allen; May^{[p]}; Kito^{[p]}; Chew; Vynehall^{[a]}; Angelides^{[a]}; Clampitt^{[v]}	2:30
5.	"Madeline"	Allen; Violet Skies	Allen; Chaz Carter; Jeremy Malvin; May; Violet Skies	Allen; May; Kito; Chew; Jasper; Chrome Sparks; Vynehall^{[a]}; Violet Skies^{[a]}	2:55
6.	"Relapse"	Allen; Violet Skies	Allen; Lebbing; May; Scheller; Violet Skies	Allen; May; Kito; Chew; Scheller^{[p]}; Vynehall^{[a]}; Violet Skies^{[a]}	4:23
7.	"Pussy Palace"	Allen; Angelides	Allen; Angelides; Clampitt; May	Allen; May; Kito; Chew; Clampitt^{[p]}; Angelides^{[a]}	4:01
8.	"4chan Stan"	Allen; Angelides	Allen; Angelides; Lebbing; May; Scheller	Allen; May; Kito; Chew; Scheller^{[p]}; Angelides^{[a]}; Albert Hammond Jr^{[a]}; Clampitt^{[v]}	3:04
9.	"Nonmonogamummy" (with Specialist Moss)	Allen; Angelides; Amos Herman	Allen; Angelides; Jason Evigan; Herman; Lebbing; May	Allen; May^{[p]}; Kito; Chew; Evigan^{[p]}; Angelides^{[a]}; Clampitt^{[v]}	2:42
10.	"Just Enough"	Allen; Angelides	Allen; Angelides; Lebbing; May	Allen; May^{[p]}; Kito^{[p]}; Chew; Angelides^{[a]}; Vynehall^{[a]}	3:11
11.	"Dallas Major"	Allen; Violet Skies	Allen; Carter; Malvin; May; Violet Skies	Allen; May^{[p]}; Kito; Chew; Chrome Sparks^{[p]}; Jasper^{[a]}; Violet Skies^{[a]}	3:04
12.	"Beg for Me"	Allen; Violet Skies	Allen; Lumidee Cedeño; Clampitt; Lebbing; Steven Marsden; May; Teddy Mendez; Edwin Perez; Violet Skies	Allen; May; Kito; Chew; Clampitt; Vynehall; Violet Skies^{[a]}	3:03
13.	"Let You W/In"	Allen; Violet Skies	Allen; Micah Grossman; Malvin; May; Violet Skies	Allen; May; Kito; Chew; Jasper; Chrome Sparks^{[p]}; Violet Skies^{[a]}	2:09
14.	"Fruityloop"	Allen; Angelides	Allen; Angelides; Clampitt; Lebbing; May	Allen; May; Kito; Chew; Clampitt^{[p]}; Scheller^{[a]}; Angelides^{[a]}	3:21
Total length:					44:46

=== Notes ===
- "Beg for Me" samples "Never Leave You (Uh Oooh, Uh Oooh)", as written by Lumidee, Teddy Mendez, Edwin Perez and Steven Marsden, and performed by Lumidee.
- ^{^[p]} indicates a primary and vocal producer
- ^{^[a]} indicates an additional producer
- ^{^[v]} indicates a vocal producer

== Personnel ==
Credits adapted from Tidal and Apple Music.

=== Musicians ===
- Lily Allen – lead vocals (all tracks), backing vocals (tracks 1–9, 11–14)
- Blue May – programming (1–5, 7–9, 11–14), drums (1–5, 11–13), bass (1, 3–5, 8–11, 14), synthesizer (2–4, 6–9, 11, 12, 14), piano (2, 4, 5, 8, 12, 13), guitar (3–5, 8, 10, 13), keyboards (3, 4, 7–9, 12), bass synthesizer (12)
- Oscar Scheller – programming (1–3, 6, 8, 14), drums (2, 3, 6, 8, 14); keyboards, synthesizer (3, 6, 8); bass synthesizer (3), bass (6)
- Amy Langley – conductor, strings arrangement (1, 4–6, 10)
- Alex Marshall – cello (1, 4–6, 10)
- Jess Cox – cello (1, 4–6, 10)
- Klara Romac – cello (1, 4–6, 10)
- Rhian Porter – cello (1, 4–6, 10)
- Vicky Matthews – cello (1, 4–6, 10)
- Amy Stanford – viola (1, 4–6, 10)
- Jordan Bergmans – viola (1, 4–6, 10)
- Polly Wiltshire – viola (1, 4–6, 10)
- Sarah Chapman – viola (1, 4–6, 10)
- Blaize Henry – violin (1, 4–6, 10)
- Ellie Stanford – violin (1, 4–6, 10)
- Gita Langley – violin (1, 4–6, 10)
- Glezni Roberts – violin (1, 4–6, 10)
- Honor Watson – violin (1, 4–6, 10)
- Jessie Murphy – violin (1, 4–6, 10)
- Kotono Sato – violin (1, 4–6, 10)
- Martin Lissola – violin (1, 4–6, 10)
- Paloma Deike – violin (1, 4–6, 10)
- Sarah Sexton – violin (1, 4–6, 10)
- Stephanie Benedetti – violin (1, 4–6, 10)
- Alessandro Buccellati – drums, guitar, keyboards, programming (1)
- Hayley Gene Penner – backing vocals (1)
- Micah Jasper – programming (2, 5, 13), drums (2, 11, 13), guitar (13)
- Leon Vynehall – programming (2); drums, keyboards, programming, synthesizer (12)
- Chloe Angelides – backing vocals (3, 4, 7, 10, 14)
- Leroy Clampitt – keyboards, programming, synthesizer (3, 7, 12, 14); guitar (3, 7), drums (7, 14)
- Kito – keyboards, programming, synthesizer (3); drums (4, 6, 9, 14)
- Ian Franzino – keyboards, programming, synthesizer (4)
- Ian Hass – keyboards, programming, synthesizer (4)
- Mikey Freedom Hart – keyboards, programming, synthesizer (4)
- Chrome Sparks – programming (5, 11, 13); drums, guitar (5, 11); synthesizer (5, 13), piano (11, 13), bass (13)
- Albert Hammond Jr. – guitar (8)
- Specialist Moss – backing vocals (9)
- Jason Evigan – bass, guitar, programming (9)
- Violet Skies – backing vocals (11, 13)
- Valentina Pappalardo – backing vocals (12)

=== Technical ===
- Ben Baptie – mixing (all tracks), recording (1, 4–6, 10)
- Joe LaPorta – mastering
- Alessandro Buccellati – recording (1)
- Blue May – recording (1–12, 14)
- Leroy Clampitt – recording (1, 3, 4, 7, 8, 12, 14)
- Kito – recording (4, 10)
- Chrome Sparks – recording (5, 11, 13)
- Oscar Scheller – recording (6, 8)
- Jason Evigan – recording (9)

== Charts ==
Chart performance for West End Girl
Chart (2025–2026)	Peak position
Australian Albums (ARIA)	6
Austrian Albums (Ö3 Austria)	32
Belgian Albums (Ultratop Flanders)	5
Belgian Albums (Ultratop Wallonia)	15
Canadian Albums (Billboard)	45
Croatian International Albums (HDU)	13
Danish Albums (Hitlisten)	11
Dutch Albums (Album Top 100)	34
Finnish Albums (Suomen virallinen lista)	22
French Albums (SNEP)	143
German Albums (Offizielle Top 100)	20
German Pop Albums (Offizielle Top 100)	7
Icelandic Albums (Tónlistinn)	7
Irish Albums (Official Charts)	4
Irish Independent Albums (IRMA)	1
New Zealand Albums (RMNZ)	5
Norwegian Albums (IFPI Norge)	15
Portuguese Albums (AFP)	19
Scottish Albums (Official Charts)	1
Spanish Albums (PROMUSICAE)	63
Swedish Albums (Sverigetopplistan)	18
Swiss Albums (Schweizer Hitparade)	14
UK Albums (Official Charts)	2
UK Independent Albums (Official Charts)	1
US Billboard 200	93
US Independent Albums (Billboard)	22

== Certifications ==
Certifications for West End Girl
Region	Certification	Certified units/sales
United Kingdom (BPI)	Gold	100,000^{‡}
^{‡} Sales+streaming figures based on certification alone.

== Release history ==
List of release dates, showing region, formats, label, editions and reference
Region	Date	Format(s)	Label	Ref.
Various	24 October 2025	Streaming	BMG	
Various	30 January 2026	CD; LP; USB flash drive	BMG	

== See also ==
- List of UK top-ten albums in 2025
