= Bob Cato =

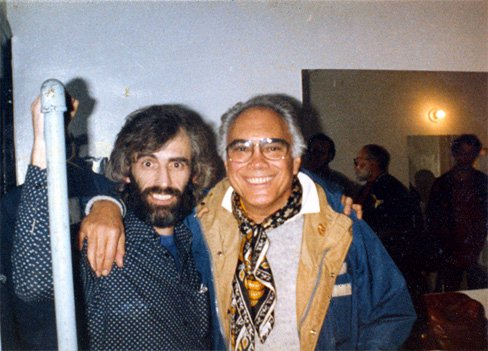
- Bob Cato (right) with Richard Manuel of The Band in 1983
- Born: September 5, 1923; New Orleans, Louisiana, U.S.
- Died: March 19, 1999 (aged 75); New York City, U.S.
- Occupation: Graphic designer
- Spouse: Kate Jennings (m. 1988)

Robert G. Cato (September 5, 1923 – March 19, 1999) was an American graphic designer, photographer, painter and collagist whose work in record album cover design contributed to the development of music and popular culture for five decades. He was vice president of creative services at Columbia Records, and later at United Artists.

== Biography ==
Bob Cato was born in 1923 to Cuban immigrant Ysabel Soto and Robert Bailey Cato in New Orleans, Louisiana. As a teenager, he studied with Mexican painters Pablo O'Higgins and José Clemente Orozco. A Quaker, Cato was imprisoned during The Korean War as a conscientious objector. He then lived in Chicago, studying with László Moholy-Nagy of the Bauhaus school. Moving to Philadelphia in 1947, Cato studied with renowned art director and magazine designer Alexey Brodovitch, eventually becoming Brodovitch's assistant at Harper's Bazaar.

Cato painted and exhibited throughout the 1940s and 1950s, while serving as art director at Dance, Glamour, Jr. Bazaar and Theatre Arts magazines.

Cato began working in the music industry in 1959 at Columbia Records, becoming vice president of creative services there and later at United Artists. During the next 20 years, he designed and oversaw hundreds of albums for dozens of artists, forging lasting relationships with many, including The Band, Johnny Cash, Miles Davis, Bob Dylan, George Harrison, Janis Joplin, and Van Morrison.

In 1966, he directed the CBS-TV miniseries Playback, featuring Leonard Bernstein, Miles Davis, John Gielgud, Johnny Mathis, and Igor Stravinsky. He also served for many years on the National Academy of Recording Arts and Sciences advisory council. In 1997, the academy awarded Cato the President's Merit Award.

Among Cato's other accomplishments was a redesign of McCalls, art directorships of Ladies' Home Journal and Jazz Review, and while vice president of Revlon, he conceived and designed the Charlie fragrance campaign, contracting Lauren Hutton to be the brand ambassador. He produced the book Joyce Images (1994), a collection of photos and art devoted to James Joyce. Cato also taught, at the School of Visual Arts and the Rochester Institute of Technology.

Bob Cato was married to Kate Jennings, an Australian writer, poet and novelist, in 1988. He died as a result of complications of Alzheimer's disease in 1999 in New York City.

His archive is at the Rochester Institute of Technology.

== Awards ==
- 1964, Grammy Awards for Best Album Cover of the Year for Barbra Streisand's People
- 1968, Grammy Awards for Best Album Cover of the Year for Bob Dylan - Greatest Hits
- 1997, President's Merit Award, National Academy of Recording Arts and Sciences
