= Porter Wagoner in Person =

Live album by Porter Wagoner
- Released: 1964
- Venue: West Plains, Missouri
- Genre: Country
- Label: RCA Victor
- Producer: Ron Steele

Porter Wagoner chronology
Y'All Come (1963)	Porter Wagoner in Person (1964)	Confessions of a Broken Man (1966)

Porter Wagoner in Person is an American live album by country music singer Porter Wagoner and other performers, including Norma Jean, Jack Little, and Bacon Rhodes. It was recorded live in West Plains, Missouri, and released in 1964 by RCA Victor (catalog no. LSP-4116).

The album debuted on Billboard magazine's Top Country Albums chart on June 20, 1964, peaked at No. 5, and remained on the chart for a total of 25 weeks.

AllMusic gave the album a rating of three stars.

== Track listing ==
Side A

1. "Howdy Neighbor Howdy"
2. "Misery Loves Company"
3. 'Head Over Heels in Love with You" (lead vocals by Norma Jean)
4. "I Didn't Mean It" (lead vocals by Norma Jean)
5. "Foggy Mountain Top" (solo by Speck Rhodes)
6. "Comedy, Sweet Fern" (comedy by Bacon Rhodes)
7. "Haven't You Heard"
8. "Eat, Drink and Be Merry"
9. "A Satisfied Mind"
10. "I Thought of God"
11. "Sally Goodin'" (violin solo by Jack Little)

Side B

1. "Come on in"
2. "My Baby's Not Here"
3. "Talk Back Trembling Lips" (lead vocals by Norma Jean)
4. "Private Little World" (lead vocals by Norma Jean)
5. "Comedy" (Bacon Rhodes)
6. "Find Out"
7. "An Old Log Cabin"
8. "John Henry" (violin solo by Jack Little)
