= May You Never Be Alone =

Single by Hank Williams With His Drifting Cowboys
- A-side: "I Just Don't Like This Kind of Living"
- Published: November 25, 1949 Acuff-Rose Publications
- Released: January 1950
- Recorded: March 1, 1949
- Studio: Castle Studio, Nashville
- Genre: Country, blues
- Length: 2:49
- Label: MGM
- Songwriter: Hank Williams

Hank Williams With His Drifting Cowboys singles chronology
"My Bucket's Got a Hole in It" (1949)	"May You Never Be Alone" (1950)	"Long Gone Lonesome Blues" (1950)

"May You Never Be Alone" is a song written and recorded by Hank Williams. It was released as the flipside of "I Just Don't Like This Kind of Living" in January 1950.

== Background ==
"May You Never Be Alone" dated back to a 1946 Williams song folio under the title "I Loved No One but You." With its poetic imagery ("Like a bird that's lost its mate in flight," "Like a piece of driftwood on the sea"), the song stands out as one of Williams' first great compositions. He recorded it with Fred Rose producing at Castle Studio in Nashville on March 1, 1949. He is backed by Dale Potter (fiddle), Don Davis (steel guitar), Zeke Turner (lead guitar), Clyde Baum (mandolin), Jack Shook (rhythm guitar), and probably Ernie Newton (bass). Clyde Baum plays the only mandolin solo to be ever featured on a Hank Williams record.

== Cover versions ==
- Porter Wagoner covered the song on his 1966 album Confessions of a Broken Man
- Wanda Jackson included it on her 1963 album Love Me Forever.
- New York City band the Godz covered the song in 1966.
- Hank Williams Jr. recorded a posthumous duet with his father for his 1973 album The Legend Of Hank Williams In Song And Story.
- Skeeter Davis and NRBQ performed the song on their 1986 album She Sings, They Play.
- Emmylou Harris performed the song on the television program In the Hank Williams Tradition.
- Willie Nelson and Larry Butler recorded the song as a duet.
