= Kito & Reija Lee =

Australian musical group

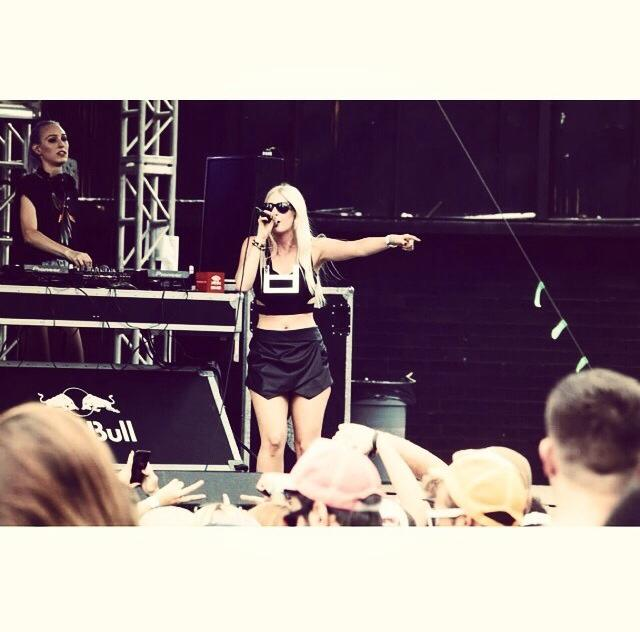
- Playing in Atlanta on 9 August 2013.

Background information
- Origin: Perth, Western Australia, Australia
- Genres: Electropop, dream pop
- Years active: 2009–2015
- Labels: Payday, Mad Decent
- Members: Maaike Kito Lebbing; Reija Lee Thomas
- Website: www.facebook.com/kitoreijalee

Kito & Reija Lee were an Australian electropop duo formed in 2009 in Perth, Western Australia, and active until 2015. They released a few singles and two EPs.

== History ==
Maaike Kito Lebbing and Reija Lee Thomas met as teenagers and began working together as the duo Kito & Reija Lee in September 2009. Their break out track, "Sweet Talk", was featured in Victoria's Secret 2010 world-wide campaign, and reached number six hundred and forty eight on the iTunes Dance Music charts. Their second EP, II, was released on 22 July 2014.

The first single of the EP II, "Starting Line", debuted 18 March 2014. Earmilk hailed as it "a brand new project which mixes sparkling melodies with Reija's standout vocals, almost putting one under hypnosis on first listen." The second single, "WORD$", was released in August 2014.

== Discography ==
=== Extended plays ===
| Title | Details |
|---|---|
| Sweet Talk EP | Released: 29 March 2011; Label: Mad Decent; Formats: Twelve-inch single, Digital download |
| II | Released: 22 July 2014; Label: Payday Records; Formats: digital download |
| II: The Remixes | Released: 26 August 2014; Label: Payday Records; Formats: digital download |

=== Singles ===
List of singles, showing year released and album name
| Title | Year | Peak chart positions | Album |
| Title | Year | US Bubb. | Album |
|---|---|---|---|
| "Sweet Talk" | 2011 | 18 | Sweet Talk EP |
| "Velma Kelly" (as Faux No) | 2012 | — | Non-album single |
| "Starting Line" | 2014 | — | II |
| "Word$" (featuring Zebra Katz) | 2014 | — | II |
"—" denotes releases that did not chart, or were not released in this territory.

=== Guest appearances ===
| Title | Year | Other artists | Album |
|---|---|---|---|
| "Pacifica (Kito & Reija Lee Vocal Remix)" | 2011 | Spor | —N/a |
| "King Shit" | 2014 | Big Boi, T.I., Ludacris | Rap Game, Vol. 2 (The Takeover) |
