= Thank You (Diana Ross album) =

Studio album by Diana Ross
- Released: November 5, 2021
- Recorded: 2020
- Studio: Diana Ross's home studio
- Length: 49:25
- Label: Decca
- Producers: Charlie McClean; Diana Ross; Fred White; Jack Antonoff; Rodney Kendrick; Theron Feemster; Triangle Park; Troy Miller

Diana Ross chronology
Diana Ross Sings Songs from The Wiz (2015)	Thank You (2021)

Singles from Thank You
- 1. "Thank You" Released: June 17, 2021; 2. "If the World Just Danced" Released: September 3, 2021; 3. "All Is Well" Released: October 22, 2021; 4. "I Still Believe" Released: November 3, 2021

Thank You is the twenty-fifth studio album by American singer and songwriter Diana Ross, released on November 5, 2021, by Decca Records. It marks Ross' first studio album since 2006's I Love You, and her first original material since 1999's Every Day Is a New Day. The album was written during COVID-19 pandemic lockdowns in 2020 and recorded in Ross's home studio. Ross worked with songwriter and producer Jack Antonoff, as well as Jimmy Napes, Amy Wadge, Tayla Parx, and Spike Stent. The title track was issued as the lead single on June 17, 2021, and is one of nine tracks on the album co-written by Ross. The album received a nomination for Best Traditional Pop Vocal Album at the 65th Grammy Awards, Ross' first nomination since 1983.

Themes of gratitude, love, and resilience are prevalent throughout the album, reflecting Ross's introspections during the pandemic.

== Singles ==
Thank You debuted and peaked at No. 38 on the UK Singles Sales Chart and No. 37 on the UK Singles Downloads Chart on June 25, 2021.

"If the World Just Danced", a house-pop song, peaked at No. 57 on the UK Singles Sales Chart and 56 on the UK Singles Downloads Chart dated October 15, 2021.

== Tour ==
Ross toured Europe and the UK in support of the album, performed the title track during her closing act of the Queen's Jubilee concert on June 4 and embarked on the second leg of her Thank You Tour in the United States in late August 2022.

== Critical reception ==
Professional ratings
Aggregate scores
Source	Rating
Metacritic	60/100
Review scores
Source	Rating
AllMusic	2.5/5 stars
Entertainment Weekly	B
The Guardian	2/5 stars
The Line of Best Fit	8/10
MusicOMH	3.5/5 stars
NME	3/5 stars
Pitchfork	6.2/10
PopMatters	5/10
Rolling Stone	3.5/5 stars

Thank You received mixed reviews from critics. According to the review aggregator Metacritic, Thank You received "mixed or average reviews" based on a weighted average score of 60 out of 100 from 11 critic scores.

Andy Kellman of AllMusic said, "Conviction is always evident in her soothing voice, even when it's modulated to a jarring extent or sounds somewhat garbled." Chuck Arnold of Entertainment Weekly said, "Thank You is a powerful showcase for how good Ross is even after a two-decade absence." Alexis Petridis of The Guardian said, "[Let's Do It] feels like proof that Diana Ross could still make a great album if she wanted to, if she was steered more carefully, or partnered more sympathetically. But she hasn't been, and this is the result: Thank You, but no thank you." Ross Horton of The Line of Best Fit said, "Diana Ross simply has no right to produce music this engaging, this vital, at this point in her life - and this devil may care attitude has enabled her to produce one of the most definitive bodies of work in her entire career." Mojo said, "On the plus side, Ross is in good voice, but as comeback albums go, this is an underwhelming affair." Alex Jeffery of MusicOMH said, "Nobody is trying to do anything too contemporary here, and the slight remove these musicians bring to creating contemporary Ross music means we often get a pastiche of her earlier material. It's effective, but the danger is that it veers tantalisingly close to sounding like an ironic tribute. And so, the album perhaps fares best in its simplest, and most sincerely constructed moments." Gary Ryan of NME said, "Ultimately, it feels as if everybody involved in 'Thank You' has reverentially tried to make the platonic ideal of a Diana Ross album, but instead fallen into the late-career artist deadzone of a pleasant record that neither particularly updates nor diminishes her legacy." Ben Cardew of Pitchfork said, "On Thank You, Diana Ross' musical star shines strong after six decades of inspiration, offering signs of renaissance even as she teases tender farewells." Steve Horowitz of PopMatters said, "She mostly sounds tired, and her voice seems wrapped in gauze. The record is grandiosely overproduced, so Ross often competes with walls of instrumentation and always loses." David Browne of Rolling Stone said, "The songs feel familiar, as if they've even assembled from parts of previous hits. ... All that said, there's still an inordinate deal of pleasure to be taken in music that wants to sweep you up and revel in sonic bliss, whether you've emerged from a still-lingering pandemic or not." Uncut said, "As with her best material, it's an album to lip-synch for your life to."

== Commercial performance ==
Thank You performed moderately on the charts. In the United Kingdom, it debuted at No. 7 on the UK Albums Chart, becoming her first top-10 album in 26 years. In the United States, it entered Billboard Top R&B Albums Chart at No. 25.

== Track listing ==
Thank You track listing
No.	Title	Writer(s)	Producer(s)	Length
1.	"Thank You"	Diana Ross; Amy Wadge; Christian Paul Wossilek; Nathaniel Ledwidge; Troy Miller	Troy Miller	3:45
2.	"If the World Just Danced"	D. Ross; Aliandro Prawl; Andre Pinckney; Scott M. Carter; Wadge; Vanessa Wood; Jaquetta Singleton	Triangle Park; Carter^{[v]}	3:44
3.	"All Is Well"	D. Ross; Fred White; Rhonda Ross	Troy Miller	4:32
4.	"In Your Heart"	D. Ross; Charles Hinshaw; Wadge	Triangle Park; Carter^{[v]}; Wood^{[v]}	4:16
5.	"Just in Case"	D. Ross; Taylor Parks; Jimmy Napes; Freddy Wexler; White	Troy Miller	3:10
6.	"The Answer's Always Love"	Siedah Garrett; Barry Eastmond	Troy Miller	4:33
7.	"Let's Do It"	D. Ross; White; Neff-U	D. Ross; White; Neff-U; Triangle Park; Carter^{[v]}	3:40
8.	"I Still Believe"	Hannah Berney; Autumn Rowe; Ruth-Anne Cunningham; Charlie McClean	McClean; Jack Antonoff	3:38
9.	"Count on Me"	Rhonda Ross	Troy Miller; Rodney Kendrick	3:30
10.	"Tomorrow"	Prawl; Wadge; Alex Stacey; Pinckney; Carter; Chris Stevens; Kyla Moscovich; Wood	Triangle Park	3:23
11.	"Beautiful Love"	D. Ross; White	Troy Miller	4:00
12.	"Time to Call"	D. Ross; Teyana Miller; Troy Miller	Troy Miller	3:31
13.	"Come Together"	D. Ross; Hinshaw; Marvee Woods; Timothy Bloom; Ayak Thiik	Troy Miller; D. Ross^{[c]}	3:43
Total length:				49:25

Notes

- ^{^[c]} indicates a co-producer
- ^{^[v]} indicates a vocal producer

== Personnel ==
Musicians

- Diana Ross – vocals, executive production, liner notes
- Troy Miller – bass (1, 11), drums (1, 3, 11, 13), guitar (1, 6, 11), horn (1), percussion (1, 3), piano (1, 5, 6, 11–13), synthesizer (1, 3, 11), Rhodes (3), conductor, strings (6, 9, 12); Moog bass (6), celesta (11)
- James Gardiner-Bateman – saxophones (1)
- Nichol Thompson – trombone (1, 13)
- Mike Davis – trumpet (1, 13)
- Tom Walsh – trumpet (1, 13)
- Vanessa Wood – background vocals (2, 4, 7, 10), vocal arrangement (2, 7), vocal programming (2, 4, 7)
- André Pinckney – bass (2, 4, 7, 10), acoustic guitar (4), electric guitar (4, 10), keyboards (7, 10)
- Ali Prawl – keyboards, keyboards arrangement (2, 4, 7, 10); drum programming (2, 4, 10), programming (2, 10)
- Scott M. Carter – programming, vocal programming (2, 4, 7, 10); drum programming (2, 7)
- Althea Edwards – background vocals (3, 5)
- Philly Lopez – background vocals (3, 5)
- Sharlene Hector – background vocals (3, 5)
- Teyana Miller – background vocals (3, 5, 13)
- Brian Bender – bass (3)
- John Ashton Thomas – conductor (3, 11, 13)
- Royal Philharmonic Orchestra – strings (3, 5, 11, 13)
- James Morgan – conductor (5)
- Keyon Harrold – trumpet (5)
- London Symphony Orchestra – strings (6, 9, 12)
- Fred White – background vocals (7, 11)
- Theron Feemster – keyboards (7, 13), drum programming (13)
- Autumn Rowe – background vocals (8)
- Charlie McClean – background vocals, bass, conga, percussion, piano, synthesizer (8)
- Evan Smith – background vocals, bass, electric guitar, flute, programming, saxophones, synthesizer (8)
- Ruth-Anne Cunningham – background vocals (8)
- Violet Skies – background vocals (8)
- Jack Antonoff – bass, bongos, drums, electric guitar, programming, synthesizer, tambourine (8)
- Mikey Freedom Hart – bass, electric guitar, keyboards, piano (8)
- Annie Clark – electric guitar (8)
- Cole Kamen-Green – trumpet (8)
- Bobby Hawk – trumpet (8)
- John Peters – digital piano, Moog bass, programming (9)
- Rodney Kendrick – piano (9)
- Michael Olatuja – upright bass (9)
- Bernard Lambert – drums (10)
- Chris Stevens – horn (10)
- Kyla Moscovich – horn (10)
- Aiden Miller – tambourine (12)
- Prince Charlez – background vocals (13)
- Paul Booth – baritone saxophone (13)
- Timothy Bloom – bass guitar, electric guitar (13)

Technical

- Randy Merrill – mastering
- Mark "Spike" Stent – mixing (1–4, 6–12)
- Troy Miller – mixing (5, 13)
- Danny Allin – engineering (1)
- Matt Wolach – engineering (1–4, 6–12)
- Scott M. Carter – engineering (2, 4, 7, 10), vocal engineering (2), vocal production (2, 4, 7)
- Olga FitzRoy – engineering (3, 11, 13)
- Lewis Jones – engineering (5, 6, 9, 12)
- Laura Sisk – engineering (8)
- Pete Min – engineering (11)
- Patrick Collier – engineering (13)
- Tom Walsh – engineering (13)
- Vanessa Wood – additional engineering (4), vocal production (4)
- John Rooney – engineering assistance (8)
- Jon Sher – engineering assistance (8)

Artwork

- Jeri Heiden – design
- Nadia Flower Scribbles – illustrations
- Randee St. Nicholas – photography

== Charts ==
Chart performance for Thank You
Chart (2021)	Peak position
Australian Albums (ARIA)	185
Belgian Albums (Ultratop Flanders)	33
Belgian Albums (Ultratop Wallonia)	62
Dutch Albums (Album Top 100)	42
French Albums (SNEP)	78
German Albums (Offizielle Top 100)	33
Japanese Albums (Oricon)	70
Japanese Hot Albums (Billboard Japan)	97
Scottish Albums (Official Charts)	6
Swiss Albums (Schweizer Hitparade)	21
UK Albums (Official Charts)	7
US Top Current Album Sales (Billboard)	16
US Top R&B Albums (Billboard)	25
