= Thank You (Diana Ross song) =

Single by Diana Ross

from the album Thank You
- Released: June 17, 2021
- Genre: Pop soul
- Length: 3:45
- Label: Decca
- Songwriters: Diana Ross; Amy Wadge; Christian Paul Wossilek; Nathaniel Ledwidge; Troy Miller
- Producer: Troy Miller

Diana Ross singles chronology
"Love Hangover" (2020)	"Thank You" (2021)	"If the World Just Danced" (2021)

Music video
- "Thank You" on YouTube

"Thank You" is a song recorded by American singer Diana Ross for her twenty-fifth studio album of the same name (2021). It was released on June 17, 2021 by Decca Records as the lead single from the album.

== Overview ==
This single was Ross's return to music, as she has not released new material since 2006, when an album of cover versions of I Love You was released, and the singer has not released original material since 1999. Ross stated that the record titled "Thank You" is a gesture of gratitude and love to all her listeners, which is reflected in the song of the same name. Ross herself took part in writing the composition and co-wrote the song with Amy Wadge, Christian Paul Wossilek, Nathaniel Ledwidge and Troy Miller, who also produced the track.

== Critical reception ==
Tom Breihan of Stereogum called the track "bright and shimmery". David Browne in his review for Rolling Stone noted that "the springy groove and positive atmosphere of "Thank You" are reminiscent of the times of "Upside Down" and "I'm Coming Out"". In a review for The Telegraph, Neil McCormick stated that Ross's voice over the years "retained its elegant glide and smooth tone, with familiar slightly piercing high notes and some appropriately imperious spoken passages," but suggested that the song "has too many glistening digital effects".

== Music video ==
The music video for the song was presented on Ross' official YouTube channel on the same day. It is a cut from the singer's previous music videos, videos from various concerts, interviews and backstages from photo shoots.

== Track listing ==
Digital download and streaming

1. "Thank You" – 3:45

Digital download and streaming

1. "Thank You" (Eric Kupper Remix) – 6:18

Digital download and streaming

1. "Thank You" (Jax Jones Remix) – 3:47

== Personnel ==
Musicians

- Diana Ross – vocals
- Troy Miller – bass, drums, guitar, horn, percussion, piano, synthesizer
- James Gardiner-Bateman – saxophones
- Nichol Thompson – trombone
- Mike Davis – trumpet
- Tom Walsh – trumpet

Technical

- Mark "Spike" Stent – mixing
- Danny Allin – engineering
- Matt Wolach – engineering

== Charts ==
Chart performance for "Thank You"
Chart (2021/2022)	Peak position
UK Singles Downloads (Official Charts)	32
UK Singles Sales (OCC)	35
