= David Burris =

American songwriter

David Burris (also credited as Dave Burris or David Allen Burris) is an American filmmaker, television producer, writer, and musician. He directed the feature film The World Made Straight and wrote and directed the short film The Side of the Road. He has worked as an executive producer on CBS’s Survivor and as a writer on the USA/Syfy series Good vs. Evil. David Burris has also performed as a guitarist in the North Carolina bands The Veldt and Jolene.

== Education ==
Burris attended the University of Edinburgh but ultimately earned his bachelor's degree from UNC–Chapel Hill and his master's degree from Wake Forest University. At UNC's student television station, Burris formed a sketch comedy troupe with filmmakers Peyton Reed and John Schultz, among others. They produced a series called The World of Fun that was influenced by Monty Python's Flying Circus and Second City Television.

== Career ==
=== TV work – Los Angeles (1999–present) ===
In 1999 Burris moved to Los Angeles and became a writer for the SyFy/USA series Good vs. Evil with fellow Carolinians Jonas and Josh Pate. He then worked on the CBS blockbuster series Survivor, initially as a supervising producer and later as an Executive Producer.

=== Film work (2013–present) ===
In 2013, Burris resumed working on feature films. He directed and produced The World Made Straight, an adaptation of Ron Rash's award-winning novel of the same name. Burris' producing partners on the picture were fellow North Carolina natives Todd Labarowski of Dreambridge Films and Michael Wrenn. Shot on location in the mountains around Asheville, North Carolina, the film stars Jeremy Irvine, Noah Wyle, Minka Kelly, Adelaide Clemens, Steve Earle, and Haley Joel Osment. It was released theatrically in 2015 by Millennium Entertainment.

The New York Times calls The World Made Straight "a coming-of-age story in which codes and vendettas loom larger than the outside world." The film's soundtrack features a score by NC psych-folk band Megafaun and songs from Ellie Goulding, The Frames, Algia Mae Hinton, Susan Cowsill, The Connells, and Hotel Lights.
