= Nieves González =

Spanish painter (born 1996)

Nieves González (born 1996) is a Spanish painter based in Granada. She painted the album cover for British singer Lily Allen's 2025 album West End Girl. Her work incorporates contemporary clothing, particularly quilted puffer jackets, into portraits that use Spanish Baroque aesthetics.

== Early life ==
González was born in 1996 in Huelva, Spain. She started painting after her mother bought her a Van Gogh Sunflowers painting set. Yellow became her favorite color.

González enrolled at 17 in the Faculty of Fine Arts at the University of Seville and received a classical education influenced by Diego Velázquez and Francisco de Zurbarán. She earned money selling portraits at Seville markets and painting caricatures at weddings. After completing a master's degree in art, she worked in a Huelva cosmetics store, then tried living in Italy including a nanny job in the north and dental assistant in L'Aquila before returning to Spain to focus on art full-time.

== Career ==
González taught art classes in Huelva while building her practice and created a Baroque copy in an hour for Huelva's new museum.

In 2025, she painted the album cover for Lily Allen's West End Girl, showing the singer in a Miu Miu periwinkle blue puffer jacket with white polka dots and knee-high Valentino boots. The singer has a serene yet slightly sad gaze. She created two additional still lifes for the album, one with a tennis racket and balls referencing a song lyric, and another with passports alluding to a tabloid scandal.

González opened her debut solo exhibition "Sacred Hair" at T293 Gallery in Rome on view until 6 February 2026, focusing on Mary Magdalene. In the exhibition, she reimagines Magdalene with saintly attributes like long golden hair, ointment jars, chalice but in contemporary settings, often wearing puffer jackets. González was drawn to Magdalene as a powerful historical woman whose importance was diminished and miscast by male authorities over time. She views Magdalene as representing a conscious, autonomous woman with her own spirituality. Curator Victoria Rivers noted that González places women as active agents with knowledge and power, rewriting classical canons by shifting sacred elements into everyday and contemporary contexts.

In March 2026, the National Portrait Gallery, London unveiled the painting, hanging it near a David Hockney work and calling her one of the most compelling voices in figurative painting today.

González has an upcoming solo exhibition at Richard Heller Gallery in Los Angeles in June 2026.

=== Artistry ===
González creates time-warping portraits of women that blend mythic and modern elements. Her main influences are the Spanish Baroque painters Jusepe de Ribera, Francisco de Zurbarán, and Diego Velázquez. She also draws inspiration from her studio mates, literature, music, podcasts, and the local culture where she lives. She often dresses her female subjects in colorful puffer jackets instead of traditional regal robes, using the puffer as a signature garment that gives the figure a sculptural quality while keeping it contemporary.

Her style features ethereal or biblical muses in puffer jackets, subverting traditional aesthetics by giving subjects more agency and "main character energy." As of 2026, González uses an old laptop received on her 18th birthday with an AI system to generate composite "Frankensteins" from Baroque portraits, her sketches, and other references as the basis for her oil paintings.

González sometimes sees traces of her own face in the finished portraits, even though the models are imaginary.

== Personal life ==
In 2025, González moved to Granada with her boyfriend artist Agus Díaz Vázquez and works in a shared basement studio with other artists.
