= Confessions of a Broken Man =

Studio album by Porter Wagoner
- Released: August 1966
- Studio: RCA Victor Studios, Nashville
- Genre: Country
- Label: RCA Victor
- Producer: Bob Ferguson, Chet Atkins

Porter Wagoner chronology
Porter Wagoner in Person (1964)	Confessions of a Broken Man (1966)	Soul of a Convict and Other Great Prison Songs (1967)

Confessions of a Broken Man is a studio album by country music singer Porter Wagoner. It was released in 1966 by RCA Victor (catalog no. LPM-3593).

The album debuted on Billboard magazine's Top Country Albums chart on October 8, 1966, peaked at No. 6, and remained on the chart for a total of 17 weeks. The album included the No. 3 hit, "Skid Row Joe". The album won a Grammy for Best Album Cover, Photography.

AllMusic gave the album a rating of four-and-a-half stars.

== Track listing ==
Side A

1. "Men with Broken Hearts" (Hank Williams)
2. "I Just Came to Smell the Flowers" (Vic McAlpin)
3. "May You Never Be Alone" (Williams)
4. "Skid Row Joe" (Freddie Hart)
5. "Take Me Back and Try Me One More Time" (Ernest Tubb)
6. "How Far Down Can I Go" (Harlan Howard, Jerome C. Barney)

Side B

1. "I'm a Long Way from Home" (Hank Cochran)
2. "Confessions of a Broken Man" (Bill Anderson)
3. "My Tears Are Overdue" (Hart)
4. "I've Been Down That Road Before" (Williams)
5. "Thy Burdens Are Greater Than Mine" (Pee Wee King)
6. "My Last Two Tens" (McAlpin)
