= Three Wives =

Mountain in Washington (state), United States

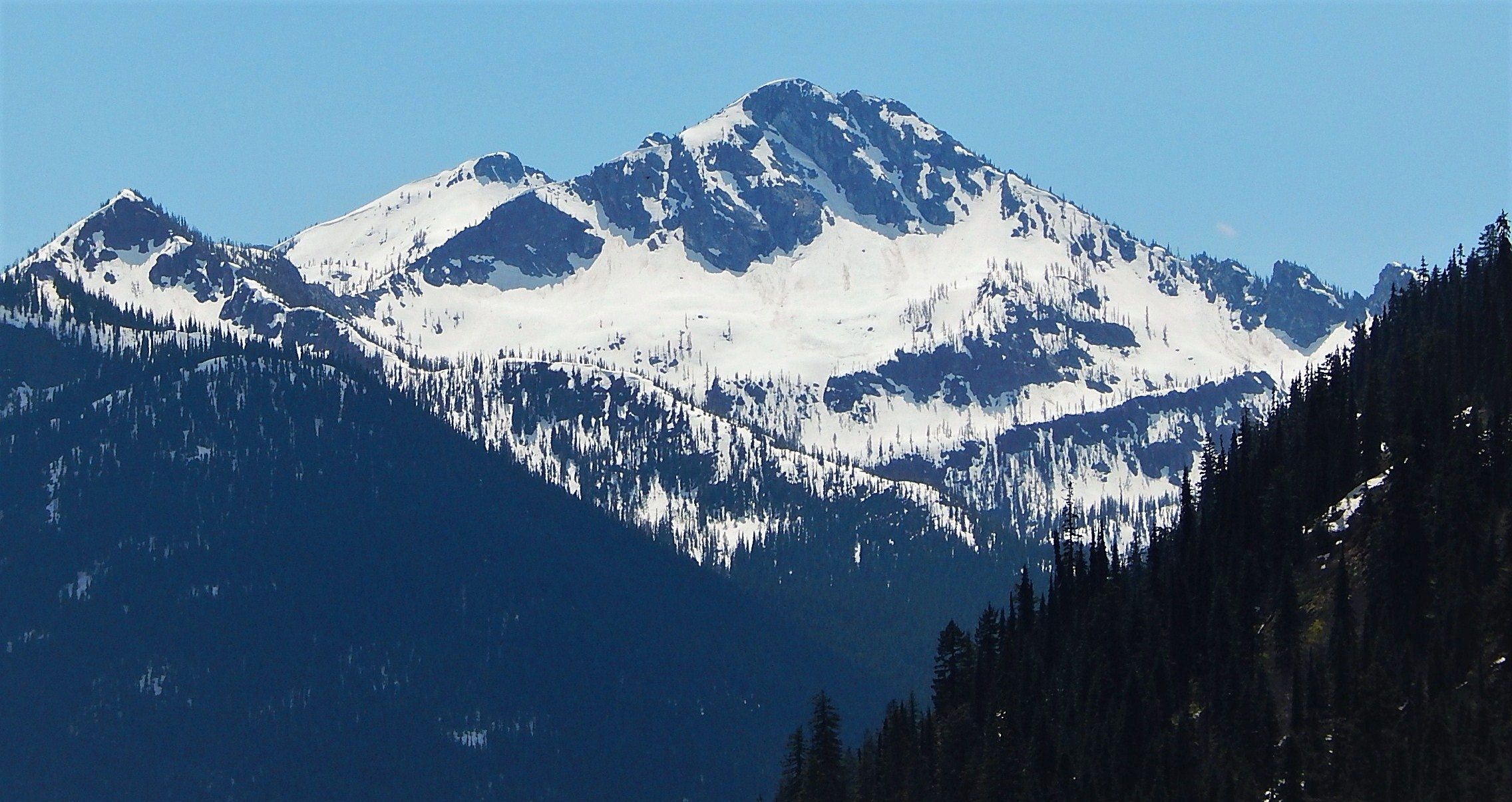
- North aspect, from North Cascades Highway

Highest point
- Elevation: 7,450 ft (2,271 m)
- Prominence: 730 ft (223 m)
- Parent peak: Bowen Mountain (7,895 ft)
- Isolation: 1.94 mi (3.12 km)
- Coordinates: 48°26′10″N 120°43′48″W

Geography
- Location within Washington (state) Location within the United States
- Interactive map of Three Wives
- Country: United States
- State: Washington
- County: Chelan
- Protected area: North Cascades National Park
- Parent range: North Cascades
- Topo map: USGS McAlester Mountain

Climbing
- First ascent: 1980 by John Roper

Three Wives is a 7,450 foot (2,271 m) mountain summit located in North Cascades National Park, in Chelan County of Washington state, USA. It is situated in the Methow Mountains, a subset of the North Cascades. Neighbors include Hock Mountain 3 miles (4.8 km) to the east-northeast and Bowen Mountain, the nearest higher neighbor, 2 miles (3.2 km) to the south. Precipitation runoff from Three Wives drains into tributaries of Bridge Creek, which in turn is a tributary of the Stehekin River. The first ascent of the summit was made by John Roper on October 10, 1980. The mountain's name was applied by Roper, but has not been officially adopted by the United States Board on Geographic Names, so it does not appear on USGS maps.

== Climate ==
Weather fronts originating in the Pacific Ocean travel east toward the Cascade Mountains. As fronts approach the North Cascades, they are forced upward (Orographic lift) by the peaks of the Cascade Range, causing them to drop their moisture in the form of rain or snow onto the Cascades. As a result, the west side of the North Cascades experiences high precipitation, especially during the winter months in the form of snowfall. Because of maritime influence, snow tends to be wet and heavy, resulting in avalanche danger. During winter months, weather is usually cloudy, but due to high pressure systems over the Pacific Ocean that intensify during summer months, there is often little or no cloud cover during the summer.

== Geology ==
The North Cascades has some of the most rugged topography in the Cascade Range with craggy peaks, ridges and deep glacial valleys. Geological events occurring many years ago created the diverse topography and drastic elevation changes over the Cascade Range leading to the various climate differences. These climate differences lead to vegetation variety defining the ecoregions in this area.

The history of the formation of the Cascade Mountains dates back millions of years to the late Eocene Epoch. With the North American Plate overriding the Pacific Plate, episodes of volcanic igneous activity persisted. In addition, small fragments of the oceanic and continental lithosphere called terranes created the North Cascades about 50 million years ago.

During the Pleistocene period, over two million years ago, glaciation advancing and retreating repeatedly scoured the landscape leaving deposits of rock debris. The U-shaped cross section of the river valleys is a result of recent glaciation. Uplift and faulting in combination with glaciation have been the dominant processes which have created the tall peaks and deep valleys of the North Cascades.

== See also ==
Geography of the North Cascades
