= Kito (musician) =

Australian producer and songwriter (born 1987)

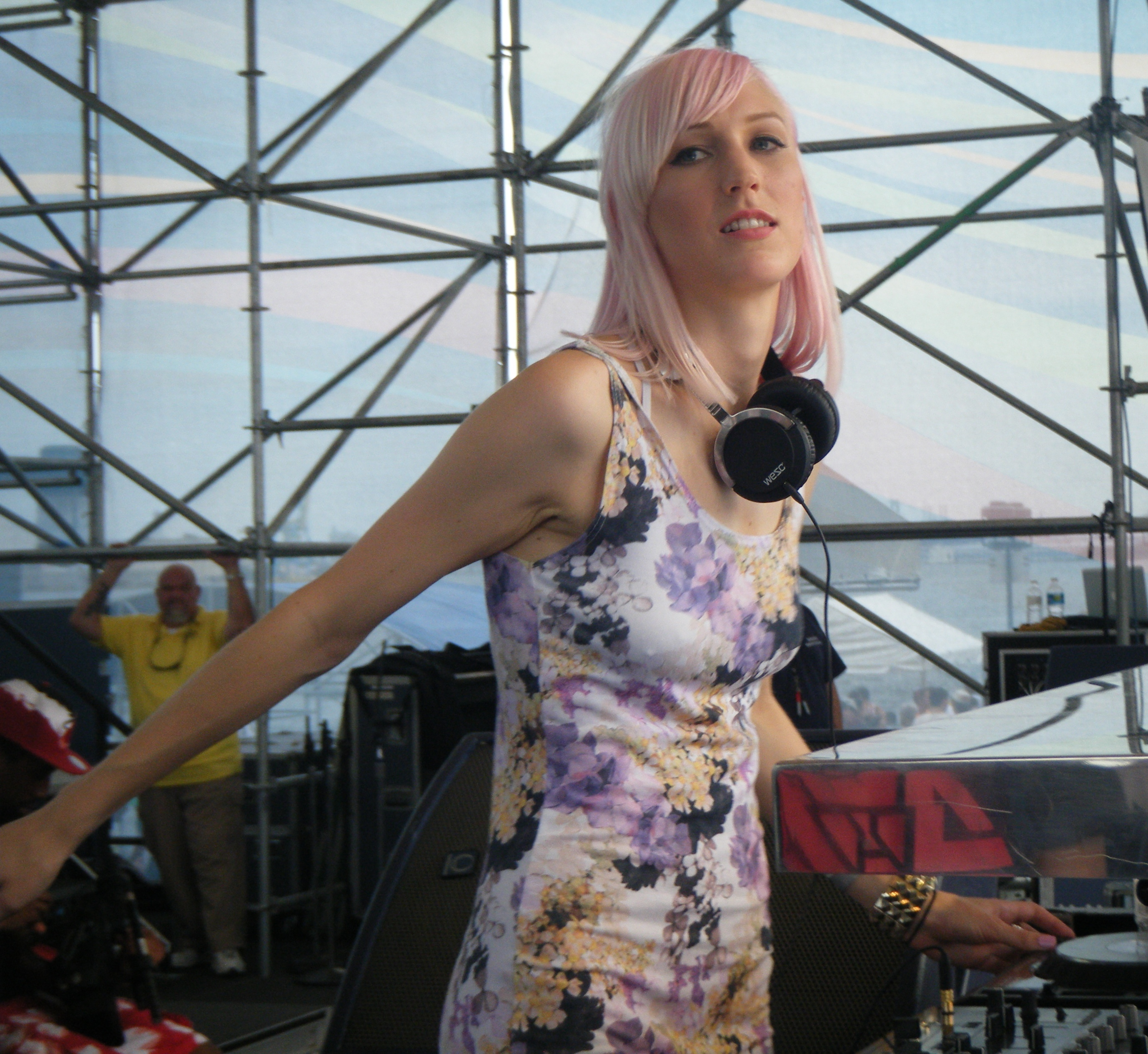
- Kito disk jockeys in 2011

Background information
- Born: Maaike Kito Lebbing; June 20, 1987 (age 38); Denmark, Western Australia
- Genres: Electronic, pop
- Occupations: Producer, artist, DJ
- Years active: 2008–present
- Labels: Payday, Mad Decent, Sony, Ed Banger Records, Astralwerks, Capitol
- Website: kitomusic.com

Maaike Kito Lebbing, known professionally as Kito, is an Australian record producer, songwriter and DJ currently based in Los Angeles, California. Between 2011 and 2014, she was a member of the duo Kito & Reija Lee, and in 2012 collaborated with Feadz on Electric Empire. She has released an EP in 2018 called Haani and a number of singles, and has remixed songs for others as well as producing songs. In 2019 she was nominated for the Breakthrough Songwriter of the Year (Los Angeles) at the 2020 Global APRA Music Awards.

== Biography ==
Kito grew up in the small town of Denmark, Western Australia, and first began producing music as a teenager using FruityLoops. At 17, Kito moved to Perth to study fashion, however soon quit and began working at a record store while studying music for a year at TAFE. Kito began working as a DJ at nightclubs in Perth, and in 2006 travelled to Europe for a year, which led her to develop a love of dubstep and inspired her to become a full-time musician.

In 2008, she debuted her first releases through Skream's Disfigured Dubz label. Kito later sent demos of hers which she had created with friend and vocalist Reija Lee to producer Diplo on MySpace, which caused him to sign them to his label Mad Decent as a duo. Kito & Reija Lee relocated to London in 2011, releasing their debut extended play Sweet Talk in the same year, as well as remixing Beyoncé's "Run the World (Girls)". Kito collaborated with Feadz in 2012 on the EP Electric Empire, and in 2013, rapper Trinidad James sampled the group's song "Run for Cover" for his song "Females Welcomed", which was also later used as a sample for Big Boi, T.I. and Ludacris' song "King Shit". The group released a second EP in 2014, II, however disbanded in 2015. Kito remained in London and worked as a producer, creating songs for musicians such as Mabel, and worked on Jorja Smith's 2018 debut album Lost & Found.

After a break-up in 2017, Kito moved back to her hometown in Western Australia, and recorded her second solo EP, Haani. The EP, released in the following year, featured collaborations with musicians such as Elley Duhé, Broods and Hudson Mohawke. She soon relocated to Los Angeles, and after signing to Astralwerks/EMI Music Australia released "Wild Girl", a collaboration with Empress Of, soon followed by "Alone with You" featuring AlunaGeorge.

In 2019, Kito was nominated for the Breakthrough Songwriter of the Year (Los Angeles) at the 2020 Global APRA Music Awards.

In September 2022, Kito released "Sad Girl Music" featuring Banks.

Kito co-wrote a number of tracks on Lily Allen's October 2025 album West End Girl.

== Artistry ==
Kito was influenced by her mother's love of Kate Bush as a child, as well as DJ Shadow's Endtroducing..... (1996) and Dr. Octagon's Dr. Octagonecologyst (1996) which were introduced to her by her sister. As a teenager, Kito primarily listened to drum and bass and hip hop, and cites Burial as one of the dubstep musicians who influenced her love of the genre.

== Discography ==
=== Extended plays ===
Title	Details
Kito EP	Released: 20 September 2010; Label: Disfigured Dubz; Formats: Twelve-inch single, Digital download
Electric Empire (Feadz & Kito)	Released: 26 March 2012; Label: Ed Banger Records, Because Music; Formats: Twelve-inch single, CD, digital download
Haani	Released: 19 October 2018; Label: Bimyou; Formats: Digital download, streaming
Blossom	Released: 5 November 2021; Label: Kito, UMG; Formats: Digital download, streaming

=== Singles ===
List of singles, showing year released and album name
Title	Year	Peak chart positions		Certiffication	Album
Title	Year	US Dance	US Dance Airplay	Certiffication	Album
"What If"	2008	—	—		Non-album singles
"Cold"	2008	—	—		Non-album singles
"Get Faded" (featuring Tara Carosielli)	2015	—	—		Non-album singles
"Ego"	2018	—	—		Haani
"Strawberries" (featuring Elley Duhé, Trinidad James and Kodie Shane)	2018	—	—		Haani
"Creature Kind" (with Broods)	2018	—	—		Haani
"Wild Girl" (with Empress Of)	2019	—	28		Non-album singles
"Alone with You" (featuring AlunaGeorge)	2020	—	—		Non-album singles
"Bitter" (with Fletcher)	2020	—	—	RIAA: Gold	The S(ex) Tapes
"Follow" (with Zhu and Jeremih)	2020	20	35		Non-album single
"Recap" (with VanJess and Channel Tres)	2021	32	—		Blossom
"Steal My Clothes" (with Bea Miller)	2021	—	—		Blossom
"Skin & Bones" (featuring Winona Oak)	2021	—	—		Blossom
"Locked On You" (with Broods)	2021	—	—		Blossom
"Sad Girl Music" (featuring Banks)	2022	—	—		Non-album single
"Take Your Vibes and Go" (featuring Kah-Lo, Brazy, & Baauer)	2024	—	—		BIMYOU
"Back 2 Love" (featuring Wafia & Nonso Amadi)	2024	—	—		
"Deya"	2025	—	—		
"Echo"/"Tight"	2025	—	—		
"Hold Close" (with Mallrat and jamesjamesjames)	2025	—	—		
"—" denotes releases that did not chart, or were not released in this territory.

=== Remixes ===
Title	Year	Other artists	Album
"Away with Me (Kito Remix)"	SpectraSoul featuring Tamara Bless	Away with Me EP	
"Who Gon Stop Me (Kito Remix)"	Jay-Z and Kanye West	—N/a	
"Mirror Maru (Feadz & Kito Remix)"	2013	Cashmere Cat	Mirror Maru Remixes
"Too Proud (Kito Remix)"	2019	Broods	—N/a
"Flowers and Superpowers (Kito Remix)"	2019	Wafia	—N/a
"Navvy Pieces (Kito Remix)"	2020	Navvy	—N/a
"Venus Fly Trap (Kito Remix) [feat. Tove Lo]"	2021	MARINA	—N/a
