= Austin Brown =

American singer-songwriter (born 1985)

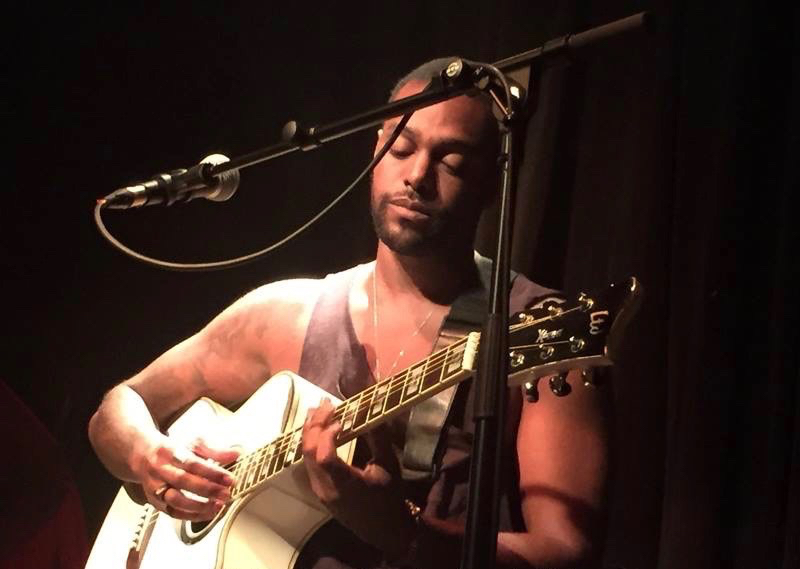
- Brown performing in Paris; 2011

Background information
- Born: Nathaniel Austin Brown; November 22, 1985 (age 40); Tarzana, California, U.S.
- Occupations: Singer; songwriter; record producer
- Years active: 2005–present
- Labels: Interscope; South Five
- Mother: Rebbie Jackson
- Family: Jackson family (maternal)

Nathaniel Austin Brown (born November 22, 1985) is an American singer-songwriter and record producer.

== Early life ==
Brown was born in Tarzana, California, on November 22, 1985, to Nathaniel Brown and Rebbie Jackson. He is a member of the Jackson family and only son of singer Rebbie Jackson and her late husband Nathaniel Brown. He has two older sisters, Stacee and Yashi.

== Career ==
=== 2005–2015 ===
Austin Brown was signed to Interscope Records after a showcase for Jimmy Iovine and later signed with South Five Records. He started his career working as a Producer/Songwriter, collaborating with Tim & Bob, The Underdogs, Cory Rooney, Q-Tip, Pharrell Williams, and Rodney "Darkchild" Jerkins. In 2011, Brown released his first single, "All I Need," on KIIS-FM and debuted his Highway 85 mixtape trailer at Wango Tango.

On February 14, 2012, Brown released the music video for "Menage A Trois" on Vevo, Music Choice, Centric, 106 & Park, and MTVU. Outside of the U.S., "Menage A Trois" had plays in Italy, Japan, Netherlands, and UK Radio. In the UK, "Menage A Trois" reached Number 1 for 3 weeks on UK's Bang Radio 103.6 FM.

In mid-2012 Brown started a residency at The Central performing with his band in LA, with additional shows in Las Vegas, Boston, and New York City. During this time Austin Brown performed at CSU East Bay's 'Springfest' with Miguel and Lupe Fiasco. He also had televised appearances on FOX's "Good Day New York," CNN, and the Pandora stage at SXSW. This is also when Brown joined the BET "Music Matters" program, performing on their stages in both Los Angeles and NYC.

On December 21, 2012, Idolator premiered "Highway to the Sky." Highway 85 was then picked up by Global 14, Idolator, Centric, Rap-Up, Singers Room, Ryan Seacrest's AXS Live, Huffington Post, and USA Today. Soon after, "Menage A Trois," "City of Angels," and "Highway to the Sky" were added to the KCRW Los Angeles radio rotation. Brown later performed at KCRW's School Night Concert Series at Bardot in Hollywood and a Pop-Up Shop KIISS 102.7 event with his band, followed up by additional performances throughout the year.

In 2013, Highway 85 was officially released through iTunes. During this time Austin Brown was featured in Vogue Italia and Vman fashion magazines. In June 2013, Brown continued performing live and in July he performed at the L.A. Live BET "Music Matters Experience" with Marsha Ambrosius, as well as live at the BET Awards 2013. His Pepsi "Music Matters" commercial aired the same day.

In January 2014, Austin performed at the Sundance Film Festival in Salt Lake City, Utah, for Hollywood TV. Soon after, a demo-version of "Smile" was put into rotation on KCRW by DJ Chris Douridas.

In 2015, Austin Brown played with The Roots during their annual Grammy Jam.

=== 2016–2017 ===
Austin Brown debuted his Guitar & Microphone series to sold-out audiences in Paris, France at the Theatre de la Contrescarpe in the summer of 2016. While traveling in Boston, he gave seminars at Berklee College of Music and Boston Arts Academy on Songwriting. During this time, Austin paired up with DJ Tony Touch to form CaliYork releasing "Show Up At My Place" in September 2016. He continued his live performances through 2017 with residencies at The Sayers Club (with his band The Blvck Castles) and Hotel Café (Guitar & Microphone series). He also performed at the "Live @ Sunset Marquis Concert Series" in Hollywood and acoustically at Rockwood Music Hall in NYC.

On June 2, 2017 "Smile" was officially released on iTunes through Ebro on Apple Music, Beats Radio 1.

In August, Austin was featured on Revolt TV's Revolt Sessions performing an acoustic set and then performed at the SELECT Pre-Emmy Party at the Peppermint Club in September.

In October 2017 Austin released his acoustic "Canyon Sessions" EP, available on Spotify and iTunes.

=== 2018 ===
Austin is credited as a Writer and Producer on Ashlee + Evan, the debut EP from the married, musical duo Ashlee Simpson and Evan Ross (aka Ashlee + Evan). He co-wrote and co-produced "I Do," "Paris," "Tonic," and "I Want You." Austin Brown makes cameos in E!'s reality television series, Ashlee + Evan, which documents the making of the EP.

Writer, Producer, and Musician on Macy Gray's album Ruby. Austin Brown is credited as a Writer of "Witness," Drums and Guitar for "When it Ends," and Musician, Vocals (Background) on "Cold World." Other musical credits on Ruby include Composer, Keyboards, Synthesizer, and Xylophone.

== Philanthropy ==
In September 2017, Austin Brown performed "Smile," as well as Eric Clapton's "Change the World" alongside Evan Ross at the Operation Smile Gala.

Other charitable causes Austin has worked with include Red Eye, A Place Called Home, Children's Hospital of Los Angeles, Friend Movement Campaign, and After-School All-Stars.

== Discography ==
=== 2007 ===
Blonde Ambition (Motion Picture Soundtrack)

- "Let's Make Love," Writer/Producer

=== 2012 ===
JoJo – Agápé (mixtape)

- "We Get By," Writer/Producer
- "Take the Canyon," Writer/Producer
- "Billions," Writer
- "Thinking Out Loud," Writer

=== 2013 ===
Austin Brown – Highway 85 (Mixtape)

- "Highway to the Sky"
- "Menage A Trois"
- "Volcano"
- "Where Were You"
- "What Did I Lose To Love You"
- "City of Angels"
- "F'd with my Mind" (Explicit)
- "Stargazer"
- "Groove 92"
- "To Love Her"
- "All I Need" (feat. David Banner)
- "Feel It Again"

House of Lies – S2E10 "Exit Strategy" (Television Soundtrack)

- "Highway to the Sky," Writer/Producer

=== 2015 ===
JoJo – LoveJo2

- "Thinkin Out Loud," Writer/Producer

=== 2016 ===
Ariana Grande – Dangerous Woman

- "Leave Me Lonely," Musician

CaliYork

- "Show Up At My Place," Writer/Producer

Yonas Michael

- "Mr. Black President," Producer

=== 2017 ===
Austin Brown – Canyon Sessions EP

- "For the Rest of My Life"
- "Million Ways"
- "Body"
- "She's Not for You"
- "Get Away"
- "Slow Down"
- "Smile"
- "All over Mine"

Eden xo

- "Finger," Writer/Producer

Macy Gray feat. Nik West

- "Stop, Drop, Roll," Producer/Musician

Amanda Tinkler

- "Make You Wanna," Writer/Producer

=== 2018 ===
Ashlee + Evan – Ashlee + Evan (EP)

- "I Do," Writer/Producer
- "Paris," Writer/Producer
- "Tonic," Writer/Producer
- "I Want You," Writer/Producer

Macy Gray – Ruby

- "Witness," Writer
- "When It Ends," Drums and Guitar
- "Cold World," Vocals (Background), Musician

Yonas Michael – Love is Legal (EP)

- "Santa Barbara," Writer/Producer
- "Blue California," Writer

=== 2019 ===
Raven-Symoné

33000 Writer/Producer (2019)

- Microdosing
- Undecided
- Left Behind
- Weird Day

Infrasounds (2020) (Produced and co-wrote)

- Space Truck
- Bu
- Ghost (Feat. Domino)
- Napswag
- Boring

=== 2020 ===
Raven-Symoné

Serah (2020) (Produced and co-wrote)

BLVK Cvstle

Anthem of Love EP (2020)

- Blvk Opera
- Passion
- Fried Chicken
- Space
- Gitmo
- Anthem of Love

JoJo

December Baby (2020)

- Noelle (Feat. Jacob Collier)
- I Come Ye Faithful Interlude
- December Baby
- Coming Home
- Deck the Halls - Interlude
- Wrap Me Up
- North Pole
- What Child is This - Interlude
- Wishlist
- We Wish You a Merry Christmas Interlude

=== 2021 ===
Rhye

My Heart Bleeds (Co-wrote and Produced)

Helpless (Co-wrote and Produced)

Austin Brown

Heart over Mind (Piano instrumental Jazz album)

- Go
- Inspired by Duke
- Gut Was Right
- Sad
- Look Up
- What's New
- Choices

=== 2022 ===
Tank and the Bangas

Red Balloon Album (Grammy Nominated Album)

Stolen Fruit (Produced and co-wrote)

- Why Try (Produced and co-wrote)

Jamila Woods

- Boundaries (Produced and co-wrote)

Austin Brown

- Fire
- Lay Low

=== 2023 ===
Baby Rose

Fight Club (Writer)

CALIYORK

Dirty Little Secret (Produced and co-wrote)

- Austin Brown, Tony Touch feat. Snoop Dogg

CS Armstrong

Let the People Decide (Produced and co-wrote)

- Walk on Water
- Butterflies
- Don't Blow My High

Masego

Afraid of Water (Produced and co-wrote)

Remember Sundays (Writer)

Ibrahim Maalouf

Capacity to Love

- Humble Feat. Austin Brown (Produced and Wrote)

THE WRLDFMS - Tony Williams

Avec Toi Je Suis Moi (The Ballad of Josephine Baker) (Produced and co-wrote)

Diddy featuring Teyana Taylor

Love Album (Grammy Nominated album)

- Closer to God (Produced and co-wrote)

Lucky Daye

That's You (Writer)

Soft (Writer)
