= Thirteens (album) =

Studio album by Leona Naess
- Released: 16 September 2008
- Recorded: 2005–2008
- Genre: Rock
- Labels: Verve Forecast (US); Polydor (UK)
- Producers: Samuel Dixon; Jason Darling; Jimmy Hogarth; Nathan Larson; Leona Naess

Leona Naess chronology
Leona Naess (2003)	Thirteens (2008)

Professional ratings
Review scores
Source	Rating
ABC News	(favorable)
AllMusic	3.5/5 stars
CityLife	4/5 stars
Daily Mirror	3/5 stars
Ellesmere Port Pioneer	8/10 stars
The Guardian	3/5 stars
Inthenews.co.uk	8/10 stars
Philadelphia Daily News	B+
Scripps Howard News Service	4.5/5 stars
The Wall Street Journal	(favorable)

Thirteens is an album by Leona Naess, released in the US on 16 September 2008 by Verve Forecast Records, and released in the UK on 11 May 2009 by Polydor Records.

The album was influenced by the death of Naess's father, Arne Næss, Jr., in a mountaineering accident in January 2004. Naess returned to London from New York City and eventually began writing and recording songs with music producer Samuel Dixon. Naess recorded with almost no budget, asking friends to contribute, and completed an album's worth of material. Eleven songs were selected for the release, titled Thirteens. Described as "a sweet and poignant collection" by New York magazine, much of the album deals with the onset of maturity. The album consists of first takes, which were then overdubbed.

A digital download of the album available on the iTunes Store includes a bonus track featuring singer-songwriter Ryan Adams; an exclusive edition available through retailer Barnes & Noble includes two bonus tracks. The UK release includes two bonus tracks unavailable on previous releases of the album.

== Track listing ==
No.	Title	Writer(s)	Length
1.	"Ghosts in the Attic"	Samuel Dixon, Leona Naess	3:45
2.	"Leave Your Boyfriends Behind"	Dixon, Naess	4:05
3.	"Learning as We Go"	Dixon, Naess	4:07
4.	"Unnamed (This Song Makes Me Happy)"	Jason Darling, Naess	3:51
5.	"Not the Same Girl"	Dixon, Naess	4:21
6.	"Swing Swing Gently"	Naess	3:42
7.	"Heavy Like Sunday"	Dixon, Naess	2:54
8.	"Shiny on the Inside"	Dixon, Naess	3:59
9.	"The Lipstick Song"	Dixon, Naess	2:39
10.	"When Sharks Attack"	Naess	3:32
11.	"On My Mind"	Naess	2:29

iTunes Store edition
No.	Title	Writer(s)	Length
12.	"Leave Your Boyfriends Behind" (feat. Ryan Adams)	Dixon, Naess	3:47

Barnes & Noble Exclusive edition
No.	Title	Writer(s)	Length
12.	"On My Toes"	Dixon, Naess	3:55
13.	"Hiccups"	Dixon, Naess	4:24

UK Version
No.	Title	Length
12.	"Danke Schoen"	3:11
13.	"Unnamed (Mellow Version)"	4:10

== Personnel ==
- Asif Ahmed – management
- Felix Bloxsom – percussion, drums, keyboards
- Andy Bradfield – mixing
- Greg Calbi – mastering
- The Christiania String Quartet
  - Camilla Kjøll – first violin
  - Lina Marie Årnes – second violin
  - Ida Bryhn – viola
  - Andreas Torday Gulden – cello
- Rupert Cobb – trumpet
- Jason Darling – bass, electric guitar, producer, drum programming
- Samuel Dixon – acoustic guitar, bass, mandolin, piano, glockenspiel, electric guitar, harmonium, melodica, producer, engineer, Mellotron, clapping
- Emery Dobyns – engineer, mixing
- Tormod Gangfløt – string arrangements
- Larry Goldings – keyboards
- Lisa Hansen – release coordinator
- Harry's Tribeca Alcoholic Choir – background vocals
- Jimmy Hogarth – acoustic guitar, banjo, percussion, electric guitar, programming, producer, executive producer, piano engineer
- Andy Kman – release coordinator
- Oliver Kraus – strings
- Bengt Lagerberg – drums
- Nathan Larson – organ, bass, electric guitar, producer
- Sophie Michalitsianos – cello, cello arrangements, piano
- Leona Naess – acoustic guitar, percussion, piano, electric guitar, vocals, producer, vibraphone, clapping
- John Newcott – release coordinator
- Al Newman – art direction, design
- Tom Schick – engineer
- Gus Seyffert – acoustic guitar, electric guitar, acoustic bass
- Zakee Shariff – art direction, design
- Martin Slattery – piano
- Mia Theodoratus – harp
- Chris Thile – mandolin
- Eva Vermandel – photography
- Joey Waronker – drums
