= Arne Næss Jr. =

Norwegian businessman and mountaineer (1937–2004)

- Born: Arne Rudolf Ludvig Raab; December 8, 1937; Germany
- Died: January 13, 2004 (aged 66); Groot Drakenstein Mountains, Franschhoek, South Africa
- Occupation: Businessman
- Spouses: Filippa Kumlin D'orey (m. 1966, divorced) Diana Ross (m. 1986; div. 2000)
- Partner: Camilla Astrup
- Children: 7, including Leona Naess and Evan Ross
- Relatives: Arne Næss (uncle)

Arne Næss Jr. (Urban East Norwegian: [ˈɑ̂ːɳə ˈnɛsː]; born Arne Rudolf Ludvig Raab; 8 December 1937 – 13 January 2004) was a Norwegian businessman and the second husband of actress and singer Diana Ross.

== Early life ==
Næss was born in Germany, to German physician August Oskar German Raab and Kirsten "Kiki" Dekke Næss, a Norwegian national whose brother was philosopher and mountaineer Arne Næss. Næss' family lived in Germany during World War II. His parents divorced after the war, and Næss moved to Norway with his mother where they both took her maiden name Næss.

== Career ==
In 1964, Næss moved to New York to work for his uncle Erling Dekke Næss, a shipping magnate and businessman. He started his own business in London in 1968 where he was successful in shipping and oil, and in real estate. He would go on to make a few bad investments in the 1990s in Pyramid scheme Global Money Games. His biggest success was an investment in an IT business, Tandberg Data, and various global real estate investments. At the time of his death in 2004, Næss' shipping empire was reputedly worth some $600 million. He spent his final years in Switzerland.

=== Mountaineering ===
By age 19, Næss had already made twenty first ascents of Norwegian mountains. In the 1960s, he focused primarily on his career. In the 1970s, he returned to mountain climbing. In 1985, he led the first Norwegian expedition to Mount Everest. Also participating was British mountaineer Chris Bonington. Næss reached Everest's summit on 29 April 1985. When asked, during a late-1990s television interview, about the risks of mountaineering, Næss replied, "If I hadn't liked risks, I would rather have played tennis or golf."

== Personal life ==
In 1966, Næss married Filippa Kumlin d'Orey of Sweden and together they had a son, Christoffer, and two daughters, Katinka and singer-songwriter Leona Næss. After they divorced, he was in a relationship with Norwegian actress Mari Maurstad. In 1985, Næss met American singer Diana Ross on a trip to the Bahamas. He and Ross married in 1986 and had two sons, Ross Arne Næss (born October 7, 1987) and Evan Olav Næss (born August 26, 1988). Through his marriage, he gained three stepdaughters, Rhonda Ross Kendrick (Ross' daughter with Motown Records founder Berry Gordy), Chudney Ross, and Tracee Ellis Ross; the latter two are Ross' daughters from her first marriage to music executive Robert Ellis Silberstein. Ross and Næss divorced in 2000, and he spent the remainder of his life with Norwegian-born Camilla Astrup; they had two sons, Nicklas and Louis.

== Death ==
Næss was staying with his friend Johann Rupert on 13 January 2004 when he died in a climbing accident while descending from a peak on Rupert's estate in the Groot Drakenstein mountains near the town of Franschhoek outside Cape Town, South Africa. According to police reports, Næss' anchoring equipment loosened from the porous mountainside, leading to a 103-metre (338 ft) fall. He was 66 years old.

In May 2004, Næss was posthumously awarded the Laureus Lifetime Achievement Award.
