= J. Michael Trautmann =

American actor

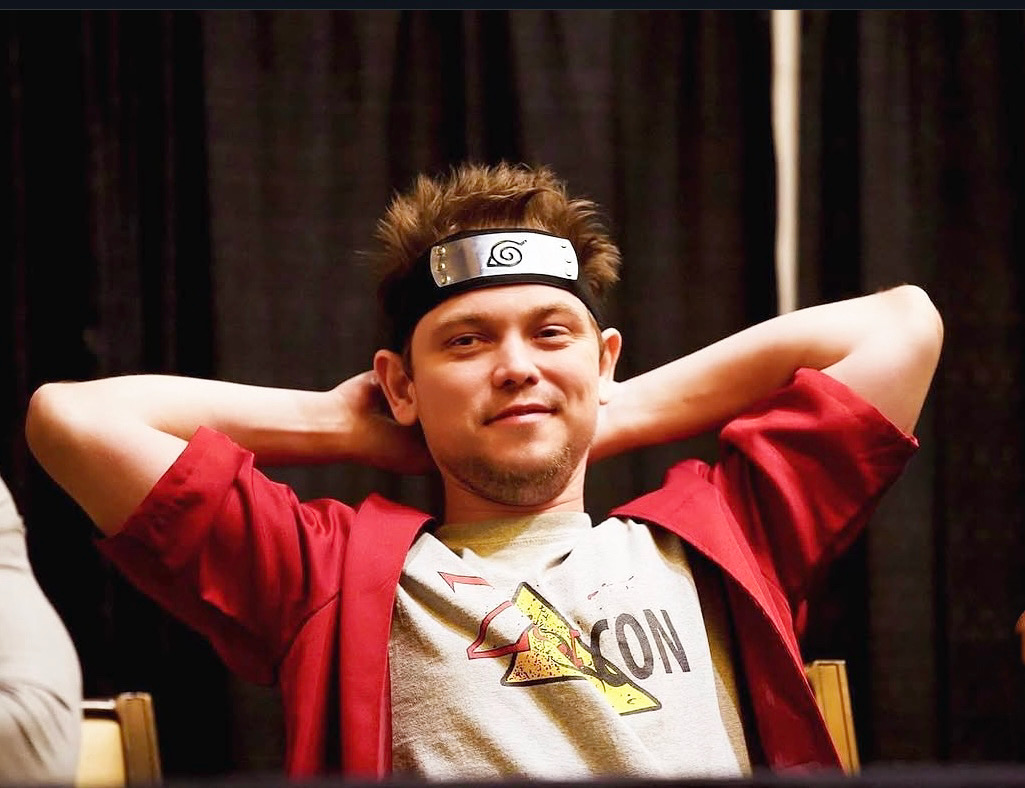
- Born: Milwaukee, Wisconsin, U.S.
- Education: University of Arizona
- Occupation: Actor
- Known for: Shameless, Here Comes the Boom, Longmire, Kirby Buckets
- Spouse: Mandell Maughan (2025–present)

J. Michael Trautmann is an American film and television actor best known for his role as Iggy Milkovich in the Showtime series Shameless and as Derrick in the Happy Madison Productions film Here Comes the Boom. He has also recurred as Trey in Longmire and Trav Babcock in the Disney XD series Kirby Buckets.

== Early life and education ==
Trautmann was born in Milwaukee, Wisconsin, and raised in Brooklyn Center, Minnesota, often referred to as the "Gang Armpit of Minnesota." Speaking on his upbringing, he said, "I grew up in a quintessential Mid West suburb, playing sports & taking advantage of the many theatre opportunities in Metro Minneapolis."

Known as the class clown during his school years, Trautmann's path to acting began in his freshman year of high school when he was encouraged to audition for the school's production of Romeo and Juliet. He landed the titular role, sparking a lasting interest in performance.

After graduating high school, he enrolled at the University of Arizona, where he was accepted into the Arizona Repertory Theatre BFA Acting Program. There he portrayed Eugene Jerome in Neil Simon's autobiographical trilogy — Brighton Beach Memoirs, Biloxi Blues, and Broadway Bound. During his sophomore year, a talent agent spotted Trautmann performing with an improv comedy troupe and invited him to audition for his first film.

== Career ==
Trautmann's earliest screen credit dates to 2004, when he appeared in the New York University short film Earnie. After completing his degree in Tucson, he relocated to Los Angeles to pursue acting, professionally.

Trautmann played Kevin in the crime thriller 96 Minutes (2011 film), starring alongside Brittany Snow, Evan Ross, Christian Serratos, and David Oyelowo. The film premiered at the South by Southwest Film Festival in March 2011.

His television career gained momentum with a recurring role as Iggy Milkovich in Showtime's Shameless. He also had a recurring role in AMC's Longmire and appeared regularly in Disney XD's Kirby Buckets.

On the film side, Trautmann appeared in the Happy Madison Productions comedy Here Comes the Boom (2012), starring Kevin James, Salma Hayek, and Henry Winkler. He later starred in the horror thriller Treehouse and the crime drama, Savage Youth (2018), directed by Michael Curtis Johnson. J. Michael has also appeared in guest roles on network dramas including Lie to Me, Bones, NCIS: Los Angeles, Criminal Minds Southland and How I Met Your Father.

In 2015, Trautmann was listed among the clients of the newly formed Silver Fox Entertainment talent management company, as reported by Variety.

== Personal life ==
Trautmann is married to actress Mandell Maughan, known for her roles in Resident Alien and Free Bert (2026). The couple married in September 2025.

== Filmography ==
Year	Title	Role	Notes
2004	Earnie	Earnie	New York University short film
2008	The Guys I Hang Out With	Damon	7 episodes
2009	18-Year-Old Virgin	Marshall	The Asylum
2009	Itch	Billy	Dir. Ian Delaney
2010	Pigeon Kicker	Adam / Real Scott	Dir. Milton Liu
2010	For The Birds	Jesse	Dir. Adam LeHouillier
2011	Lie to Me	Mark	Season 3, Ep. 11 "Saved"
2011	96 Minutes (2011 film)	Kevin	SXSW Audience Award
2011	Hardcore Hearts	Jackson Morse	Dir. Danny Herb
2011	Two Dollar Bill	Sammy	Dir. Brian Rowe
2011	Stay Still	Dejan	UCLA short film
2012	Southland	Kevin	Season 4, Ep. 10 "Thursday"
2012	Last Call	Derrick	
2012–2015	Shameless	Iggy Milkovich	Recurring; Seasons 2, 3 & 5; Showtime
2012	Here Comes the Boom	Derrick	Happy Madison Productions
2013	A Resurrection	Eli Driggers	
2013	Bones	Julian Anton	Season 9, Ep. 11 "The Spark in the Park"
2013	NCIS: Los Angeles	Driver	Season 5, Ep. 11 "Iron Curtain Rising"
2012–2013	Longmire	Trey	Recurring; AMC
2014	Mindless	Billy	
2014	Treehouse	Killian	St. Louis Film Festival Audience Choice
2014	Criminal Minds	John David Bidwell	Season 10, Ep. 6 "Boxed In"
2014–2017	Kirby Buckets	Trav Babcock	Recurring; Disney XD
2015	Victor	Matteo	
2016	Bashaw	Aiden	
2016	Mamma Loves Shortnin'	Bernie	
2017	The Legend of Master Legend	Kory	Amazon Prime Video
2018	Dirty Bomb	Captain Lyle	Winner of 2 "Best Short" Awards
2018	Savage Youth	Hyde	
2018	Juveniles	Junior	
2018	ZombieCON	Mystic Man	2019 LA Comic Con Audience Choice
2021	The Bystanders	Dale	Podcast; Season 1, Ep. 2 "Lease Disagreements"
2023	How I Met Your Father	Spundy	Season 2, Ep. 17 "Out of Sync"
