= Ashlee + Evan (EP) =

EP by Ashlee + Evan
- Released: October 12, 2018
- Length: 19:42
- Label: Access
- Producer: Austin Brown; Brian London; Verdine White

Singles from Ashlee + Evan
- 1. "I Do" Released: September 7, 2018; 2. "Paris" Released: September 14, 2018; 3. "Safe Zone" Released: September 21, 2018; 4. "Tonic" Released: September 28, 2018; 5. "I Want You" Released: October 5, 2018

Ashlee + Evan is the debut extended play (EP) by Ashlee + Evan, an American musical duo consisting of married singers Ashlee Simpson and Evan Ross. It was released on October 12, 2018, by Access Records. The EP was released during the broadcast run of their self-titled reality television series, Ashlee + Evan.

== Background and development ==
Early in the couple's relationship, they would frequently stay up until 3:00 AM singing songs together. The couple announced their engagement in January 2014 and were married on August 31, 2014. While visiting Ross during a studio session sometime in 2015, the duo recorded a song called "Permission to Love". According to Simpson, this is when she realized that they worked well together. Simpson revealed that the couple were writing music together in May 2016. By this time, they had written approximately ten songs and were mostly focused on finding their own sound.

For the EP, the duo "wanted to do something that felt organic". They drew inspiration from Simpson's love of American soul singers Erykah Badu and Lauryn Hill, as well as Diana & Marvin (1973), a duets album by his mother Diana Ross and Marvin Gaye. The couple also found inspiration in the recordings of American musical duo Sonny & Cher.

== Singles ==
"I Do" was released as the first single from the EP on September 7, 2018. The track sold 11,000 downloads in its first week and debuted at number six on the Billboard Pop Digital Song Sales chart and at number 16 on the Digital Song Sales chart. This marked Ross' first appearance on a Billboard chart and Simpson's first chart placement in over ten years.

== Critical response ==
Mike Nied of Idolator called "Home" a "chill-inducing moment" and noted that it appears to be "one of the most sure-fire hits" on the EP.

== Tour ==
List of concerts, showing date, city, country and venue
Date	City	Country	Venue
North America
January 7, 2019	New York City	United States	Bowery Ballroom
January 8, 2019	Washington, D.C.	United States	Union Stage
January 10, 2019	Atlanta	United States	The Loft
January 11, 2019	Nashville	United States	Exit/In
January 12, 2019	Chicago	United States	Lincoln Hall
January 14, 2019	Dallas	United States	House of Blues Cambridge Room
January 17, 2019	San Francisco	United States	Slim's
January 18, 2019	Los Angeles	United States	The Roxy

== Track listing ==
No.	Title	Writer(s)	Length
1.	"I Do"	Evan Naess; Palmer Reed; Austin Brown; Brian London; Ashlee Simpson; Verdine White	3:18
2.	"Paris"	Naess; Brown; Nazerine Henderson; London; Simpson	3:18
3.	"Safe Zone"	Naess; Simpson; Henderson; Paul Blair; Jamie L Jones; Lamont Neuble; Tim Stewart	4:02
4.	"Tonic"	Naess; Brown; Henderson; London; Simpson	3:09
5.	"I Want You"	Naess; Palmer; Brown; London; Simpson; White	3:24
6.	"Home"	Naess; Simpson; Torin Martinez; Richard Velonskis; Krystin Watkins	2:28
Total length:			19:42

== Charts ==
Chart (2018)	Peak position
US Soundtrack Albums (Billboard)	17
