= In the Name of Love Tour =

2013–17 concert tour by Diana Ross

- Tour by Diana Ross
- Promotional poster for the tour
- Start date: June 23, 2013
- End date: July 29, 2017
- Legs: 14
- No. of shows: 6 in South America; 169 in North America; 4 in Asia; 179 total

Diana Ross concert chronology
- More Today Than Yesterday (2010–12); In the Name of Love Tour (2013–17); Some Memories Never Fade (2015–17)

The In the Name of Love Tour was a concert tour by American recording artist, Diana Ross. The tour visited the Americas and Asia throughout 2013, 2014, 2015, 2016 and 2017.

== Opening acts ==
- Rhonda Ross Kendrick (select dates)
- Evan Ross (Los Angeles)
- Pentatonix (Los Angeles)
- Naturally 7 (San Diego)

== Set list ==
This set list was obtained from the February 6, 2015, concert at the Durham Performing Arts Center in Durham, North Carolina. It does not represent all concerts during the tour.

1. "I'm Coming Out"
2. "More Today Than Yesterday"
3. "My World Is Empty Without You" / "Baby Love"
4. "Stop! In the Name of Love"
5. "You Can't Hurry Love"
6. "Love Child"
7. "The Boss"
8. "Touch Me in the Morning"
9. "Upside Down"
10. "It's My House" / "Why Do Fools Fall in Love"
11. "Love Hangover"
12. "Take Me Higher"
13. "Ease On down the Road"
14. "The Look of Love"
15. "Don't Explain"
16. "Do You Know Where You're Going To"
17. "Ain't No Mountain High Enough"

Encore

18. "Reach Out and Touch (Somebody's Hand)"
19. "I Will Survive"

== Tour dates ==
Date	City	Country	Venue
South America
June 25, 2013	São Paulo	Brazil	Espaço das Américas
June 26, 2013	São Paulo	Brazil	Espaço das Américas
June 29, 2013	Rio de Janeiro	Brazil	HSBC Arena
July 2, 2013	Curitiba	Brazil	Teatro Positivo
July 6, 2013	Buenos Aires	Argentina	Estadio Luna Park
July 8, 2013	Santiago	Chile	Movistar Arena
North America
August 2, 2013	Indio	United States	Fantasy Springs Special Events Center
August 3, 2013	Los Angeles	United States	Hollywood Bowl
August 4, 2013	Temecula	United States	Pechanga Showroom Theater
August 6, 2013	San Francisco	United States	Golden Gate Theatre
August 7, 2013	San Francisco	United States	Golden Gate Theatre
August 9, 2013	Boston	United States	Wang Theatre
August 11, 2013	Providence	United States	Providence Performing Arts Center
August 13, 2013	Hartford	United States	Mortensen Hall
August 14, 2013	Wolf Trap	United States	Filene Center
August 16, 2013	Newark	United States	Prudential Hall
August 17, 2013	Stamford	United States	Palace Theatre
August 18, 2013	Atlantic City	United States	Borgata Event Center
August 20, 2013	Pittsburgh	United States	Heinz Hall
August 21, 2013	Charleston	United States	Maier Foundation Performance Hall
August 23, 2013	Carmel	United States	The Palladium
August 24, 2013	Merrillville	United States	Star Plaza Theatre
August 25, 2013	Detroit	United States	Sound Board
August 27, 2013	Milwaukee	United States	Pabst Theater
August 28, 2013	Minneapolis	United States	Orpheum Theatre
August 30, 2013^{[A]}	Willemstad	Curaçao	World Trade Center Curaçao
September 3, 2013	Orlando	United States	Hard Rock Live
September 4, 2013	Hollywood	United States	Hard Rock Live
September 6, 2013	Robinsonville	United States	Harrah's Event Center
September 7, 2013	Atlanta	United States	Delta Classic Chastain Park Amphitheater
September 8, 2013	Greenville	United States	Peace Concert Hall
September 10, 2013	St. Petersburg	United States	Mahaffey Theater
September 11, 2013	Sarasota	United States	Van Wezel Performing Arts Hall
September 13, 2013	Dallas	United States	Winspear Opera House
October 28, 2013^{[B]}	Nashville	United States	CMA Theater
October 30, 2013	New Orleans	United States	Saenger Theatre
November 1, 2013	Bossier City	United States	Riverdome
November 2, 2013^{[C]}	Houston	United States	Imperial Ballroom
April 1, 2014^{[D]}	Boca Raton	United States	Akoya Amphitheater
April 23, 2014	Dallas	United States	Winspear Opera House
April 24, 2014	Catoosa	United States	The Joint Tulsa
April 26, 2014	Durant	United States	Choctaw Event Center
April 27, 2014	Kansas City	United States	Arvest Bank Theatre
April 29, 2014	Chicago	United States	Chicago Theatre
April 30, 2014	Chicago	United States	Chicago Theatre
May 2, 2014	New Buffalo	United States	Silver Creek Event Center
May 3, 2014^{[E]}	Minneapolis	United States	MCC Auditorium
June 13, 2014	Sterling Heights	United States	Freedom Hill Amphitheatre
June 14, 2014	Cincinnati	United States	The Shoe
June 17, 2014	Worcester	United States	Hanover Theatre
June 18, 2014	Hopewell	United States	CB – MS Performing Arts Center
June 20, 2014	Atlantic City	United States	Circus Maximus Theater
June 21, 2014	New York City	United States	The Theater at Madison Square Garden
June 22, 2014	Ledyard	United States	Grand Theater
June 24, 2014	Albany	United States	Palace Theatre
June 25, 2014	Philadelphia	United States	Mann Center for the Performing Arts
June 26, 2014	Bethlehem	United States	Sands Bethlehem Event Center
June 28, 2014	Baltimore	United States	Modell Performing Arts Center
June 29, 2014	Wolf Trap	United States	Filene Center
July 2, 2014	Rama	Canada	Casino Rama Entertainment Centre
July 3, 2014^{[F]}	Montreal	Canada	Salle Wilfrid-Pelletier
July 4, 2014^{[F]}	Montreal	Canada	Salle Wilfrid-Pelletier
September 17, 2014	Long Beach	United States	Terrace Theater
September 19, 2014	Las Vegas	United States	The Colosseum at Caesars Palace
September 20, 2014	Indio	United States	Fantasy Springs Special Events Center
September 21, 2014	Santa Barbara	United States	Santa Barbara Bowl
September 23, 2014	Rohnert Park	United States	Green Music Center
September 25, 2014	San Jose	United States	City National Civic
September 26, 2014	Oakland	United States	Paramount Theatre
September 27, 2014	Lincoln	United States	Thunder Valley Outdoor Amphitheater
Asia
December 31, 2014	Marina Bay	Singapore	Grand Theatre
January 2, 2015	Marina Bay	Singapore	Grand Theatre
January 6, 2015	Tokyo	Japan	Nippon Budokan
January 7, 2015	Tokyo	Japan	Nippon Budokan
North America
February 3, 2015	New York City	United States	Kings Theatre
February 5, 2015	Charlottesville	United States	Paramount Theater
February 6, 2015	Durham	United States	Durham Performing Arts Center
February 8, 2015	Nashville	United States	Ryman Auditorium
February 11, 2015	Orlando	United States	Walt Disney Theater
February 13, 2015	Sarasota	United States	Van Wezel Performing Arts Hall
February 14, 2015	Jacksonville	United States	Florida Theatre
February 16, 2015	Fort Myers	United States	Mann Performing Arts Hall
February 18, 2015	St. Petersburg	United States	Mahaffey Theater
February 19, 2015	Hollywood	United States	Hard Rock Live
February 22, 2015	Austin	United States	Bass Concert Hall
February 23, 2015	San Antonio	United States	Majestic Theatre
February 25, 2015	Midland	United States	Wagner Noël Performing Arts Center
February 26, 2015	Grand Prairie	United States	Verizon Theatre
February 28, 2015	New Orleans	United States	Saenger Theatre
May 22, 2015	Atlanta	United States	Delta Classic Chastain Park Amphitheater
May 23, 2015^{[G]}	St. Louis	United States	Fox Theatre
June 12, 2015	Honolulu	United States	Blaisdell Arena
June 13, 2015	Honolulu	United States	Blaisdell Arena
June 14, 2015	Kahului	United States	Castle Theater
June 15, 2015	Kahului	United States	Castle Theater
September 9, 2015^{[H]}	Toronto	Canada	Aria Ballroom
September 11, 2015	Windsor	Canada	The Colosseum at Caesars Windsor
September 12, 2015	Pittsburgh	United States	Benedum Center
September 13, 2015	Baltimore	United States	Pier Six Pavilion
September 15, 2015	North Bethesda	United States	The Music Center at Strathmore
September 16, 2015	Newark	United States	Prudential Hall
September 18, 2015	Ledyard	United States	Grand Theater
September 19, 2015	Boston	United States	Wang Theatre
September 20, 2015	Philadelphia	United States	Mann Center for the Performing Arts
October 16, 2015^{[I]}	Fresno	United States	Paul Paul Theatre
February 2, 2016	Nashville	United States	Laura Turner Concert Hall
February 3, 2016	Nashville	United States	Laura Turner Concert Hall
February 5, 2016	Birmingham	United States	BJCC Concert Hall
February 6, 2016	Savannah	United States	Johnny Mercer Theatre
February 9, 2016	Hollywood	United States	Hard Rock Live
February 10, 2016	Clearwater	United States	Ruth Eckerd Hall
February 13, 2016^{[J]}	Orlando	United States	Universal Music Plaza Stage
February 15, 2016	Greenville	United States	Peace Concert Hall
February 16, 2016	Charlotte	United States	Belk Theater
February 19, 2016	Shreveport	United States	Shreveport Municipal Memorial Auditorium
February 20, 2016	Shawnee	United States	Grand Event Center
February 25, 2016	Midland	United States	Wagner Noël Performing Arts Center
February 26, 2016	Thackerville	United States	Global Event Center
March 31, 2016	New Brunswick	United States	State Theatre
April 1, 2016	Atlantic City	United States	Borgata Event Center
April 3, 2016	Hartford	United States	Mortensen Hall
April 4, 2016	Montreal	Canada	Bell Centre
April 7, 2016	Rama	Canada	Casino Rama Entertainment Centre
April 8, 2016	Rama	Canada	Casino Rama Entertainment Centre
April 9, 2016	Niagara Falls	United States	Seneca Niagara Events Center
April 12, 2016	New York City	United States	St. George Theatre
April 13, 2016	Bethlehem	United States	Sands Bethlehem Event Center
April 14, 2016	Providence	United States	Providence Performing Arts Center
June 24, 2016^{[K]}	Aspen	United States	Benedict Music Tent
June 27, 2016	Calgary	Canada	Grey Eagle Event Centre
June 28, 2016	Enoch	Canada	The Venue at the River Cree Resort
June 30, 2016	Richmond	Canada	River Rock Theatre
July 1, 2016	Troutdale	United States	McMenamins Edgefield Amphitheater
July 2, 2016	Quil Ceda	United States	Tulalip Amphitheatre
July 5, 2016^{[L]}	Jacksonville	United States	Britt Pavilion
July 7, 2016	Livermore	United States	Wente Vineyards Amphitheater
July 9, 2016	Lincoln	United States	Thunder Valley Outdoor Amphitheater
July 10, 2016	Saratoga	United States	Mountain Winery Amphitheater
July 12, 2016	San Francisco	United States	Orpheum Theatre
July 13, 2016	San Rafael	United States	Marin Veterans Memorial Auditorium
July 15, 2016	Los Angeles	United States	Hollywood Bowl
July 16, 2016	Los Angeles	United States	Hollywood Bowl
July 17, 2016	San Diego	United States	Embarcadero Marina Park South
July 19, 2016	Denver	United States	Ellie Caulkins Opera House
July 21, 2016	Des Moines	United States	Civic Center of Greater Des Moines
July 22, 2016	Omaha	United States	Orpheum Theatre
July 23, 2016	Welch Township	United States	Island Event Center
July 25, 2016	Grand Rapids Charter	United States	Amphitheater Garden
July 27, 2016^{[M]}	Highland Park	United States	Ravinia Park Pavilion
July 30, 2016	Detroit	United States	Chene Park Amphitheatre
July 31, 2016	Northfield	United States	Hard Rock Live
August 1, 2016	Cincinnati	United States	PNC Pavilion
August 3, 2016	Huber Heights	United States	Rose Music Center
June 21, 2017	Sarasota	United States	Van Wezel Performing Arts Hall
June 23, 2017	Clearwater	United States	Ruth Eckerd Hall
June 24, 2017	West Palm Beach	United States	Dreyfoos Hall
June 25, 2017	Miami	United States	Ziff Ballet Opera House
June 27, 2017	Orlando	United States	Walt Disney Theater
June 28, 2017	Jacksonville	United States	Daily's Place
June 30, 2017^{[N]}	New Orleans	United States	Mercedes-Benz Superdome
July 1, 2017	Lake Charles	United States	Golden Nugget Grand Event Center
July 2, 2017	Sugar Land	United States	Smart Financial Centre
July 5, 2017	San Antonio	United States	Majestic Theatre
July 6, 2017	Austin	United States	Moody Theater
July 7, 2017	Thackerville	United States	Global Event Center
July 9, 2017	Cedar Rapids	United States	McGrath Amphitheatre
July 11, 2017	Minneapolis	United States	Northrop Auditorium
July 12, 2017	Appleton	United States	Thrivent Financial Hall
July 14, 2017	Milwaukee	United States	BMO Harris Pavilion
July 15, 2017	Hammond	United States	The Venue at Horseshoe Hammond
July 16, 2017	Fort Wayne	United States	Foellinger Theatre
July 18, 2017	Northfield	United States	Hard Rock Live
July 19, 2017	Interlochen	United States	Kresge Auditorium
July 21, 2017	Rama	Canada	Casino Rama Entertainment Centre
July 22, 2017	Rama	Canada	Casino Rama Entertainment Centre
July 25, 2017	Wolf Trap	United States	Filene Center
July 26, 2017	Binghamton	United States	Osterhout Concert Theater
July 27, 2017	Boston	United States	Leader Bank Pavilion
July 29, 2017	Philadelphia	United States	Mann Center for the Performing Arts

Festivals and other miscellaneous performances

^{A} This concert was a part of the "Curaçao North Sea Jazz Festival"
^{B} This concert was a part of "Music with Friends"
^{C} This concert was a part of the "Houston Children's Charities Gala"
^{D} This concert was a part of "The Concert for Children"
^{E} This concert was a part of the "Pacer's 32nd Annual Benefit"
^{F} This concert was a part of the "Montreal International Jazz Festival"
^{G} This concert was a part of the "26th Annual Bob Costas Benefit for SSM Cardinal Glennon Children's Medical Center"
^{H} This concert was a part of the "AMBI Benefit Gala"
^{I} This concert was a part of "The Big Fresno Fair"
^{J} This concert was a part of "Universal Studios' Mardi Gras"
^{K} This concert was a part of the "Aspen Music Festival"
^{L} This concert was a part of the "Britt Music & Arts Festival"
^{M} This concert was a part of the "Ravinia Festival"
^{N} This concert is a part of the "Essence Music Festival"

Cancellations and rescheduled shows

June 25, 2013	Rio de Janeiro, Brazil	HSBC Arena	Rescheduled to June 29, 2013
June 27, 2013	São Paulo, Brazil	Claro Live House	Rescheduled to June 25, 2013 and moved to the Espaço das Américas
June 28, 2013	São Paulo, Brazil	Claro Live House	Rescheduled to June 26, 2013 and moved to the Espaço das Américas
June 29, 2013	São Paulo, Brazil	Claro Live House	Cancelled
July 2, 2013	Curitiba, Brazil	Centro Cultural Teatro Guaíra	Moved to the Teatro Positivo
July 7, 2013	Punta del Este, Uruguay	Punta del Este Ballroom	Cancelled

=== Box office score data ===
Venue	City	Tickets sold / available	Gross revenue
Espaço das Américas	São Paulo	994 / 1,541 (64%)^{1}	$225,524
HSBC Arena	Rio de Janeiro	1,709 / 3,460 (49%)	$219,254
Teatro Positivo	Curitiba	1,241 / 2,000 (62%)	$180,221
Luna Park	Buenos Aires	1,333 / 4,900 (27%)	$159,051
Prudential Hall	Newark	5,632 / 5,632 (100%)	$514,955
Orpheum Theatre	Minneapolis	2,437 / 2,491 (98%)	$199,041
Harrah's Event Center	Robinsonville	1,850 / 2,400 (77%)	$119,557
Riverdome	Bossier City	1,083 / 1,338 (81%)	$62,236
Chicago Theatre	Chicago	5,931 / 5,931 (100%)	$494,768
The Theater at Madison Square Garden	New York City	4,997 / 5,191 (96%)	$449,207
Terrace Theater	Long Beach	2,814 / 2,814 (100%)	$217,673
The Colosseum at Caesars Palace	Las Vegas	4,172 / 4,172 (100%)	$300,394
Santa Barbara Bowl	Santa Barbara	3,227 / 4,562 (71%)	$291,798
City National Civic	San Jose	2,118 / 3,015 (70%)	$152,080
Durham Performing Arts Center	Durham	2,664 / 2,712 (98%)	$221,180
Ryman Auditorium	Nashville	1,927 / 2,193 (88%)	$211,422
Walt Disney Theater	Orlando	5,251 / 5,286 (99%)	$412,309
Mann Performing Arts Hall	Fort Myers	1,830 / 1,830 (100%)	$192,058
Wagner Noël Performing Arts Center	Midland	3,247 / 3,518 (92%)	$360,112
Wang Theatre	Boston	2,669 / 3,561 (75%)	$255,729
Mann Center for the Performing Arts	Philadelphia	5,348 / 10,460 (51%)	$430,997
BJCC Concert Hall	Birmingham	1,855 / 2,788 (66%)	$182,223
Johnny Mercer Theatre	Savannah	2,430 / 2,430 (100%)	$171,519
Ruth Eckerd Hall	Clearwater	1,613 / 2,074 (78%)	$145,573
Shreveport Municipal Memorial Auditorium	Shreveport	1,194 / 3,027 (39%)	$111,741
Bell Centre	Montreal	2,791 / 3,362 (83%)	$217,891
Casino Rama Entertainment Centre	Rama	8,277 / 9,948 (83%)	$163,477
Van Wezel Performing Arts Hall	Sarasota	1,483 / 2,020 (73%)	$131,870
Dreyfoos Hall	West Palm Beach	2,154 / 2,154 (100%)	$199,781
Ziff Ballet Opera House	Miami	2,204 / 2,311 (95%)	$209,932
Daily's Place	Jacksonville	1,575 / 5,199 (30%)	$118,135
Moody Theater	Austin	2,101 / 2,101 (100%)	$216,908
McGrath Amphitheatre	Cedar Rapids	1,418 / 3,629 (39%)	$120,814
Northrop Auditorium	Minneapolis	1,159 / 2,405 (48%)	$116,670
Thrivent Financial Hall	Appleton	1,977 / 1,977 (100%)	$209,931
The Venue at Horseshoe Hammond	Hammond	2,188 / 2,517 (87%)	$192,615
Hard Rock Live	Northfield	1,480 / 1,875 (79%)	$145,288
Blue Hills Bank Pavilion	Boston	3,805 / 5,173 (74%)	$250,210
TOTAL		102,178 / 133,997 (76%)	$8,574,144

^{1}Figures reported represents one of the two shows performed.

==== Commercial reception ====
- 2014: $6.2 million
- 2015: $10.3 million
- 2016: $5.9 million
