= Mia Theodoratus =

- Born: Mia Theodoratus; United States
- Genres: Rock, Experimental, Free improvisation
- Occupation(s): Musician, arranger
- Instrument: Harp
- Years active: 1990s – present
- Website: www.miatheodoratus.com

Mia Theodoratus is an American harpist and arranger based in Brooklyn, New York. She plays Rock, Jazz and Celtic harp.

== Biography ==
Theodoratus graduated from the California Institute of the Arts with a master's degree in harp performance.

After graduation she moved to New York City and took up residence in Brooklyn. She began to incorporate a wide variety of influences into her music including free jazz and North Indian classical music. During this period she worked with performance groups and played with jazz artists including Daniel Carter, Baikida Carroll and Roscoe Mitchell. In 1999, Theodoratus released a CD called 1 Swirl with Tabla artist Nick Smith under the name Jah-La. In 2004 Theodoratus recorded Confusing the Devil with the avant-jazz Hanuman Sextet.

She is affiliated with the Irish Arts Center where she teaches Celtic Harp and performs Celtic Music. She performed with the Shakespeare Theatre Company production of Oedipus with Avery Brooks at the Herod Atticus Theatre in Athens, Greece. She has recorded and performed with TV on the Radio, Leona Naess, Ann Magnuson and Citizens Band.

In 2008 Theodoratus performed in Dueling Harps with Magnuson, Alex Rami and Adam Dugas. Her current touring project is Ravens and Roses (with Dugas) which fuses together Irish folk tunes, rock songs and Purcell.

== Discography ==
- 1 Swirl, (1999) – Jah-La
- Confusing the Devil (2004) – The Hanuman Sextet
- Adam & Mia – EP (2008) – Adam & Mia
- Thirteens (2008) – Leona Naess
- Here Comes the Bride! (2008)
- 9 Meals from Anarchy (2009) – The Hanuman Sextet
- Celtic Harp, Irish Songs (2010)
- Soft Focus (2012) - Soft Focus
- Electric Silver (2014)
