= I Tried to Rock You But You Only Roll =

Studio album by Leona Naess
- Released: 9 October 2001
- Genre: Pop; rock
- Length: 49:14
- Label: MCA
- Producer: Martin Terefe; Jason Darling

Leona Naess chronology
Comatised (2000)	I Tried to Rock You But You Only Roll (2001)	Leona Naess (2003)

Professional ratings
Review scores
Source	Rating
AllMusic	3/5 stars
Boston Phoenix	3.5/5 stars
The Rolling Stone Album Guide	2/5 stars

I Tried to Rock You But You Only Roll is a pop/rock album by Leona Naess, her second album, released in 2001 by MCA Records.

Naess wrote much of the album while on tour in support of her debut album, Comatised (2000). She considered the album a second chapter of her debut, but felt more confident recording it at the age of 26. The title track, "I Tried to Rock You But You Only Roll" and "Mayor Of Your Town" were released as singles. The Japanese release contains two bonus tracks: "Favorite Ghost", and "Come, Come".

== Track listing ==
All songs written by Leona Naess, except where noted.

1. "Mexico" – 3:07
2. "Mayor of Your Town" (Naess, Jason Darling) – 3:48
3. "All the Stars" (Naess, Darling) – 4:48
4. "I Tried to Rock You But You Only Roll" – 3:21
5. "Sunny Sunday" – 4:12
6. "Weak Strong Heart" – 4:08
7. "Blue Eyed Baby" – 3:46
8. "Boys Like You" (featuring the Bisons) – 3:59
9. "Hurricane" – 3:59
10. "Panic Stricken" (Darling) – 4:25
11. "Serenade" – 4:09
12. "Promise to Try" – 5:26
