= Laureus Lifetime Achievement Award =

International sports award

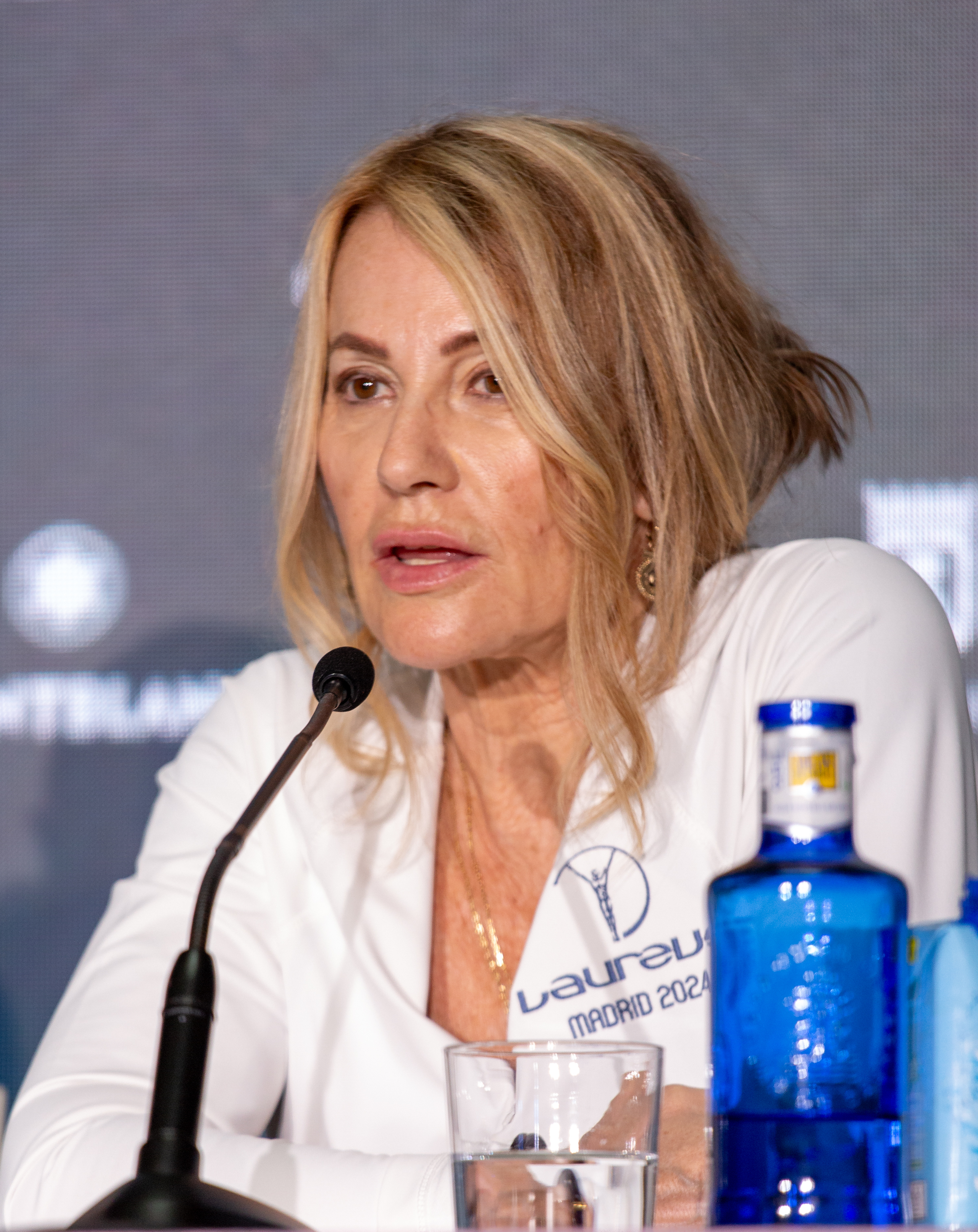
- The 2026 recipient, Nadia Comăneci
- Awarded for: lifetime achievement in sport
- Location: Madrid, Spain (2026)
- Presented by: Laureus Sport for Good Foundation
- First award: 2000
- Currently held by: (Romania) Nadia Comăneci (2026)
- Website: Official website

The Laureus Lifetime Achievement Award is an award honouring the achievements of those individuals who have made a significant contribution to the world of sports. It was first awarded in 2000 as one of the inaugural awards presented during the Laureus World Sports Awards. The awards are presented by the Laureus Sport for Good Foundation, a global organisation involved in more than 150 charity projects supporting 500,000 young people. The first ceremony was held on 25 May 2000 in Monte Carlo, at which Nelson Mandela gave the keynote speech. The recipient is presented with a Laureus statuette, created by Cartier, at an annual awards ceremony held in various locations around the world. Although the Laureus Awards ceremony is held annually, the Lifetime Achievement Award is not necessarily presented every time; it is one of a number of discretionary awards that can be given by the Laureus World Sports Academy. The awards are considered highly prestigious and are frequently referred to as the sporting equivalent of "Oscars".

The inaugural Laureus Lifetime Achievement Award was presented to Brazilian footballer Pelé. Footballers have received more awards than any other sports with five. Two individuals have been honoured posthumously. The New Zealand yachtsman Peter Blake was shot dead by pirates on the Amazon River in December 2001. Arne Næss Jr., the Norwegian mountaineer, died in a climbing accident in South Africa four months before the 2004 ceremony. No award was presented at the 2005, 2009, or 2017 Laureus Awards ceremonies; American tennis player Billie Jean King won the award in the 2021 Laureus Awards ceremony in Seville. The most recent recipient of the award is Romanian gymnast Nadia Comăneci.

== Recipients ==
Key
†	Indicates posthumous award

Laureus Lifetime Achievement Award recipients
Year	Image	Winner	Nationality	Sport	Ref.
2000	Pele in 2008	Pelé	BRA	Football	
2001	Steve Redgrave in 2011	Steve Redgrave	GBR	Rowing	
2002	–	Peter Blake †	NZL	Yachting	
2003	Gary Player in 2008	Gary Player	RSA	Golf	
2004	–	Arne Næss Jr.†	NOR	Mountaineering	
2005	No award				
2006	Johann Cruyff in 1974	Johan Cruyff	NED	Football	
2007	Franz Beckenbauer in 2014	Franz Beckenbauer	GER	Football	
2008	Sergey Bubka in 2013	Sergey Bubka	UKR	Athletics	
2009	No award				
2010	Nawal El Moutawakel in 2009	Nawal El Moutawakel	MAR	Athletics	
2011	Zinedine Zidane in 2015	Zinedine Zidane	FRA	Football	
2012	Bobby Charlton in 2010	Bobby Charlton	GBR	Football	
2013	Sebastian Coe in 2012	Sebastian Coe	GBR	Athletics	
2014	No award				
2015	No award				
2016		Niki Lauda	AUT	Formula One	
2017	No award				
2018	Edwin Moses in 2008	Edwin Moses	USA	Athletics	
2019	Arsene Wenger with Arsenal in May 2007	Arsène Wenger	FRA	Football	
2020	Dirk Nowitzki in 2019	Dirk Nowitzki	GER	Basketball	
2021	Billie Jean King in 2011	Billie Jean King	USA	Tennis	
2022	Tom Brady in 2021	Tom Brady	USA	American football	
2023	No award				—N/a
2024	No award				—N/a
2025	Kelly Slater in 2017	Kelly Slater	USA	Surfing	
2026	Nadia Comăneci in 2024	Nadia Comăneci	ROU	Gymnastics	
