= Virginia Williams =

American actress (born 1978)

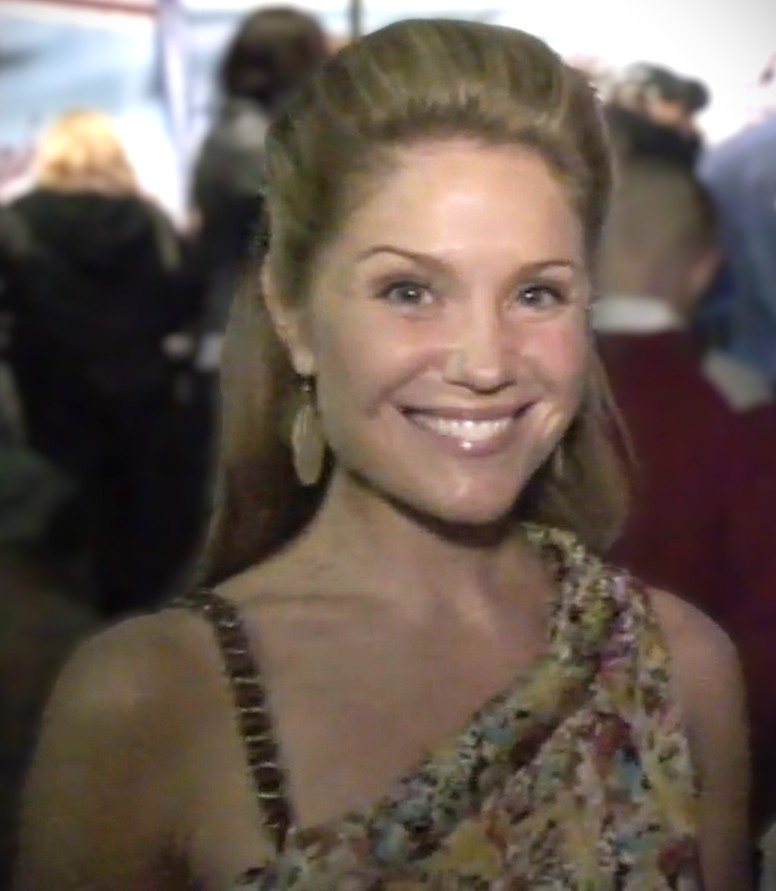
- Williams in 2010
- Born: March 19, 1978 (age 48); Memphis, Tennessee, U.S.
- Occupation: Actress
- Years active: 1995–2022
- Spouse: Bradford Bricken (m. 2007)
- Children: 2

Virginia "Ginger" Williams (born March 19, 1978) is an American former actress known for playing Lauren Reed in the main cast of Fairly Legal and her recurring role as C.J. Harbenberger in Fuller House. Her last role was a guest appearance in a 2022 episode of Leverage: Redemption.

== Early life ==
Williams was born in Memphis, Tennessee. She attended Hutchison School in from junior kindergarten when she was four years old through graduation in 1996.

Williams first began her acting education in New York, earning a B.A. in Theatre Performance from Fordham University in 2000, and later studying Shakespeare at Oxford University and at the British American Drama Academy in London.

== Career ==
Williams made her professional acting debut in the ABC daytime soap One Life to Live as Lorna Van Skyver, a role she played from 1995 to 1996. She also played Brandy Taylor on the CBS daytime soap As the World Turns from 2001 to 2002. With that experience in daytime soaps, she parlayed her talents into several primetime roles, including the leading role of Bianca on Lifetime's Monarch Cove, Claudia on five episodes of the hit series How I Met Your Mother, Shelley Long's daughter, who was snubbed at the altar, in the film Honeymoon with Mom, and two seasons on Comedy Central's Strangers with Candy. She also played the role of Caitlin McNabb, who is a gold digger, in the 2010 ABC Family TV movie Revenge of the Bridesmaids.

Williams has performed guest starring roles and recurring characters on more than two dozen shows, including The Mentalist, Rules of Engagement, Better Off Ted, Lie to Me, In Plain Sight, Two and a Half Men, My Wife and Kids, Jack & Bobby, As the World Turns, Veronica Mars and Drop Dead Diva. She has also held lead roles on numerous television pilots for every major network. In 2011, she began portraying the role of Lauren Reed on the USA Network series Fairly Legal.

In 2016, Williams was featured in Mogul's #IAmAMogul campaign for "Inspiring women to rise higher, shine brighter, and give back", as part of Women's History Month in March. She also had a guest spot on the NCIS episode "Charade" as Leah Ramsey as well as playing C.J. of the Netflix sitcom Fuller House. From 2018 to 2019, she had a recurring role in the CW Reboot of Charmed as Charity Callahan, a powerful Elder and a friend to Harry Greenwood and the late Marisol Vera. She occasionally helps the Charmed Ones and Harry on their missions to help save those in need of protection.

== Personal life ==
Williams married her husband, Bradford Bricken, a talent and literary manager, on December 31, 2007. They had their first child, a son named Bradford Powell, on November 19, 2015. Their second son, Beau Rush, was born on July 4, 2017.

== Filmography ==
=== Film ===
Year	Title	Role	Notes
2006	Honeymoon with Mom	Shannon Bates	
2006	The Last Request	Nancy Dalton	
2009	The Lodger	Rachel Madison	
2013	10 Rules for Sleeping Around	Cameron Johnson	
2015	The Culling	Val	
2015	Woodlawn	Debbie	
2016	Marriage of Lies	Jessica	

=== Television ===
Year	Title	Role	Notes
1995–1996	One Life to Live	Lorna Van Skyver	Regular role
2000	Strangers with Candy	Trudy, Susie, Wilma, Ginger	Episodes: "The Virgin Jerri", "The Blank Page", "Blank Relay", "The Last Temptation of Blank"
2001–2002	As the World Turns	Brandy Taylor	Recurring role
2004	Cold Case	Brandi Beaudry	Episode: "The Sleepover"
2004	My Wife and Kids	Bambi	Episode: "Fantasy Camp: Part 1"
2005	My Wife and Kids	Salesgirl	Episode: “Sweetheart’s Day”
2005	Strong Medicine	Tina Morgan	Episode: "Implants, Transplants and Cuban Aunts"
2005	Jack & Bobby	Natalie Schultz	Episode: "Running Scared"
2005	Half & Half	Sasha	Episode: "The Big Doormat No More Episode"
2005	The Inside	Sandra Fackler	Episode: "New Girl in Town"
2006	Veronica Mars	Heidi Kuhne	Episode: "The Quick and the Wed"
2006	Mindy and Brenda	Brenda	TV film
2006	Monarch Cove	Bianca Foster	Main role
2006-2013	How I Met Your Mother	Claudia	5 episodes
2007	Journeyman	Charlotte Skillen	Episode: "Game Three"
2007	Traveling in Packs	Carol	TV film
2007	Cavemen	Tracy	Episode: "Cave Kid"
2008	Two and a Half Men	Tricia	Episode: "Waiting for the Right Snapper"
2008	In Plain Sight	Kay Sweeny / Kay Swenson	Episode: "Who Shot Jay Arnstein?"
2008	Ernesto	Jasleen Cutler	TV film
2009	Eva Adams	Dr. Christa Caldwell	TV film
2009	Lie to Me	Nadia Dawson	Episode: "Life Is Priceless"
2009	Better Off Ted	Danielle Sargent	Episode: "Love Blurts"
2010	Rules of Engagement	Sasha	Episode: "Flirting"
2010	The Mentalist	Heather Evans	Episode: "Red All Over"
2010	Revenge of the Bridesmaids	Caitlin McNabb	TV film
2011–2012	Fairly Legal	Lauren Reed	Main role
2012	Emily Owens, M.D.	Ellen	Episode: "Emily and... the Predator"
2013	Reading Writing & Romance	Amy	TV film
2013	NCIS: Los Angeles	Carla Shear	Episode: "Iron Curtain Rising"
2014	Drop Dead Diva	Belinda Scotto	Episodes: "Truth & Consequences", "Soulmates?", "First Date"
2014	Young & Hungry	Beverly	Episode: "Young & Younger"
2014	Bad Teacher	Poppy	Episodes: "Divorced Dudes", "Found Money", "What's Old Is New"
2014	Major Crimes	Gina Hunt	Episode: "Down the Drain"
2014	CSI: Crime Scene Investigation	Claudia Mason	Episode: "Angle of Attack"
2015	Girlfriends' Guide to Divorce	Courtney Beech	Episodes: "Rule #17", "Rule #32"
2016	NCIS	Leah Ramsey	Episodes: "After Hours", "Charade"
2016–2020	Fuller House	CJ Harbenberger	Recurring role (seasons 2–3), guest (seasons 4–5)
2018–2019	Charmed	Charity Callahan	Recurring role (season 1)
2019	Modern Family	Ashley	Episode: "Commencement"
2020	Teenage Bounty Hunters	Debbie Wesley and Dana	Main role
2020	High & Tight	Veronica Moore	TV film, completed
2021	Mixed-ish	Georgia	Episode: "Tainted Love"
2021	Why Women Kill	Grace	Recurring role
2022	Leverage: Redemption	Debra Prosper	Episode: "Pyramid Job"
