= A Resurrection (film) =

- Theatrical poster
- Directed by: Matt Orlando
- Written by: Matt Orlando
- Produced by: Philip Glasser; Brian Hartman; Aaron Levine; Amanda Jane McBridge; Mischa Barton
- Starring: Mischa Barton; Michael Clarke Duncan; Devon Sawa
- Cinematography: Jeff Garton
- Edited by: Ken Conrad
- Music by: Jacob Yoffee
- Production companies: Jamie Kennedy Entertainment; Levine Pictures
- Distributed by: Archstone Distribution
- Release date: March 22, 2013
- Running time: 89 minutes
- Country: United States
- Language: English
- Budget: $5 million
- Box office: $10,730

A Resurrection (also titled The Sibling) is an American horror-thriller film written and directed by Matt Orlando. The film stars Mischa Barton, Michael Clarke Duncan and Devon Sawa. On 12 November 2012 a trailer was released. The film premiered in Sherman Oaks, Los Angeles on 19 March 2013. This was followed by a limited theatrical release in the United States on 22 March 2013.

== Plot ==
Set during a single day and night at a high school, Jessie (Barton), a guidance counselor, Addison (Duncan), the school principal and local police officer, Travis (Sawa) are the central characters of a "whodunit" as murder sweeps the school. Jessie attempts to help a mentally disturbed student, Eli, who is convinced that his dead brother will return and seek vengeance against the high school students that played a part in his death. His brother was killed after being run-over in a car allegedly driven by the group of high school students. Eli takes his brother's body to a witch who implants a spirit in the corpse. The witch informs Eli that his brother's spirit will rise after six days and will only rest again after committing six murders.

== Cast ==
- Devon Sawa as Travis Blair
- Mischa Barton as Jessie Parker
- Michael Clarke Duncan as Addison
- J. Michael Trautmann as Eli Driggers
- Stuart Stone as Nick Morris
- Nick Jandl as Brandon Marshall
- Matt Willig as Vince Marshall
- Antonio Costa as Ignacio
- Alanna Romansky as Tammy Juback
- Morgan Wolk as Dian Packett
- Brenden Meers as Alex Tiemens
- Annie Kitral as The Bruja
- Patrick de Ledebur as Devon Driggers
- Jason McCune as Sheriff Kent
- Alonzo Jimenez as Farmer

== Production ==
The film shot for 20 days, mainly at the former Knoxville Middle School in Pittsburgh.

During post-production, the film's co-star, Michael Clarke Duncan, died of a heart attack.

Certain scenes evoke comparisons with the Sandy Hook Elementary School shooting which took place during post-production. Orlando acknowledged this; “As we were making it, Sandy Hook did not happen yet. Do I think I have a responsibility in the entertainment business to think about that? Yes, I do.”

== Reception ==
The film was reviewed positively by the horror-genre specialist website, Shock Till You Drop. Tyler Doupe praised the cast's performances; ″Sawa turned in a good performance, as Travis. And Mischa Barton successfully broke the mold of the roles we’ve seen her play time and again. The late Michael Clark Duncan was excellent as the high school principal.″ Doupe also praised the resourceful use of the low budget, noting that ″The film feels like a movie that was made for a lot more money than what was actually spent...It takes true creativity to stretch a micro budget into anything more than that, and Matt Orlando stretched his budget very effectively.″ Doupe also commented that ″A Resurrection did a good job of leaving certain aspects of the film up to the viewer to figure out. We are not spoon fed every detail and audiences appreciate that. We respect filmmakers that trust their viewers to put the pieces together themselves.″ He continued; ″the premise is primarily unique. I like the way that Matt Orlando's script mixed reality with aspects of occult spirituality and kept the viewer wondering how the two were ultimately going to work together.″

== Legacy ==
Issues surrounding the production of this film would ultimately make a major impact in an unexpected area—college basketball. Pittsburgh-based financial adviser Marty Blazer used money from some of his clients, which included professional athletes, to help finance the film. The Securities and Exchange Commission alleged that he had defrauded five clients out of $2.35 million in order to fund this film and other entertainment projects. Facing federal criminal charges stemming from this episode, he became an FBI informant in a major investigation of corruption in college basketball. The first wave of indictments stemming from this investigation were announced in fall 2017, and by March 2018 more than 35 NCAA Division I men's programs were potentially implicated in NCAA rules violations.
