= 96 Minutes (2011 film) =

- Promotional poster
- Directed by: Aimée Lagos
- Produced by: Lee Clay; Paul Gilreath; David Ball; Charlie Masonhaga; J. Michael Trautmann; Adam Trahan; Jessie Rusu
- Starring: Brittany Snow; Evan Ross; J. Michael Trautmann; David Oyelowo; Christian Serratos
- Cinematography: Michael Fimognari
- Edited by: Aram Nigoghossian
- Music by: Kurt Farquhar
- Distributed by: Content Film
- Release date: March 2011 (SXSW)
- Running time: 93 minutes
- Country: United States
- Language: English

96 Minutes is a 2011 American crime thriller film written and directed by Aimée Lagos and starring Brittany Snow, Evan Ross, J. Michael Trautmann, David Oyelowo and Christian Serratos. It premiered at the SXSW Film Festival in March 2011. It was released in theaters on April 27, 2012.

== Plot ==
The film concerns a 96-minute-long story of 4 main characters in one night and their tragic ending.

Lena wakes up next to her boyfriend. They talk briefly about where he is going and what he is doing for the day. Their conversation reveals that Lena doesn't trust her boyfriend. He leaves a few minutes later. Lena, left alone in the room, decides to check his cell phone and finds a message from another girl. Filled with anger, she throws the phone against a wall.

The movie goes on to Dre and Kevin. In the class, Dre receives a test from his teacher. Dre has got a passing grade, and his teacher tells him that he can graduate. Kevin appears to be a troubled 16-year-old kid. He grew up in an abusive family, which has turned him aggressive. He attempts to join a gang in the neighborhood. However, the gang leader JJ turns down his request. JJ offers him membership on the condition that he steals his daddy's car.

The movie moves to Karley talking to her father on the phone. She convinces him to attend her graduation. It seems that her father can't join her because he has a meeting in Tokyo which coincides with her graduation. When the call ends, Karley is seen upset.

Lena goes to school and sees her boyfriend hanging out with another girl. She quickly leaves and gets to her car. Instead of reversing the car, she drives it forward and hits a tree in front of her. Her friend comes and comforts her. They make plans for a girls' night out.

The time shifts to the present, where Kevin and Dre are driving in a car with Karley and Lena held in the back. Lena is injured and bleeding profusely. Karley pleads with her captors to take Lena to the hospital. Kevin tells Dre that they should let Lena die. Dre is upset at Kevin and blames him for shooting Lena. Kevin imputes his actions on Lena. Dre tells Kevin that he's an idiot for worsening the situation.

Karley uses Lena's blood to write "Help" on the car's window. Kevin spots this and scolds Karley. Dre stops at a gas station to grab some food. Kevin, annoyed by the shopkeeper's comment, shoots him dead.

A flashback shows how Kevin and Dre got the car. The two men spot Karley and Lena chatting in an alley where Karley's car is parked. Kevin thinks that by stealing the car, he will be able to join JJ's gang. He attacks both girls. When Lena fights back, Kevin shoots her. Dre and Kevin steal the car and force the two girls into the back.

The movie returns to the present. Dre stops the car in a tunnel and gets out. He considers killing both Karley and Lena but decides not to. As Dre diverts his attention, Karley tries to escape, only to be shot by Kevin. Kevin and Dre get back in the car and drive away, leaving both Karley and Lena for dead.

The wounded Karley manages to reach the main road, where she is spotted by Dre's uncle Duane and admitted to the hospital. It has been about 96 minutes since Karley and Lena left the restaurant. Unfortunately for Lena, she is left alone in the tunnel and dies.

A few days later, Dre gets arrested, while Kevin commits suicide. Karley visits the jail to talk to Dre. As their meeting ends, she decides that she can't forgive him for his actions.

== Cast ==
- Brittany Snow as Karley
- Evan Ross as Andre "Dre"
- Christian Serratos as Lena
- J. Michael Trautmann as Kevin
- David Oyelowo as Uncle Duane
- Jon Chaffin as J.J.
- Anna Enger as Rachel
- Adam Trahan as Michael
- Sharon Morris as Rhonda
- Jessie Rusu as Jill
- Hosea Chanchez as Harassing Cop
- Sylvia Jefferies as Kevin's Mom
- Justin Martin as Raymond
- Markice Moore as Keith

== Reception ==
=== Critical response ===
Review aggregation website Rotten Tomatoes gives the film a score of 50% based on reviews from 18 critics.

Joe Leydon of Variety gave the film a positive review, noting that it "maintains a brisk pace and generates a satisfying degree of suspense" and that it "boasts strong performances by well-cast up-and-comers".

=== Awards and nominations ===
Year	Award	Category	Result
2011	Boston Film Festival	"Best Actress" – Brittany Snow	Won
2011	Boston Film Festival	"Best Director" – Aimee Lagos	Won
2011	Boston Film Festival	"Best Film" – Charlie Mason; Paul Gilreath; Aimee Lagos; Justin Moore-Lewy; Lee Clay	Won
2011	SXSW Film Festival	"Breakthrough Performance" – Evan Ross	Won
2011	St. Louis International Film Festival	"Emerging Filmmaker Award" – Aimee Lagos	Won
2011	Woodstock Film Festival	"Best Editing in a Narrative Feature" – Aram Nigoghossian	Won
2011	Woodstock Film Festival	"Best Film" – Aimee Lagos	Nominated
