= Ashlee + Evan =

American musical duo (2018–19)

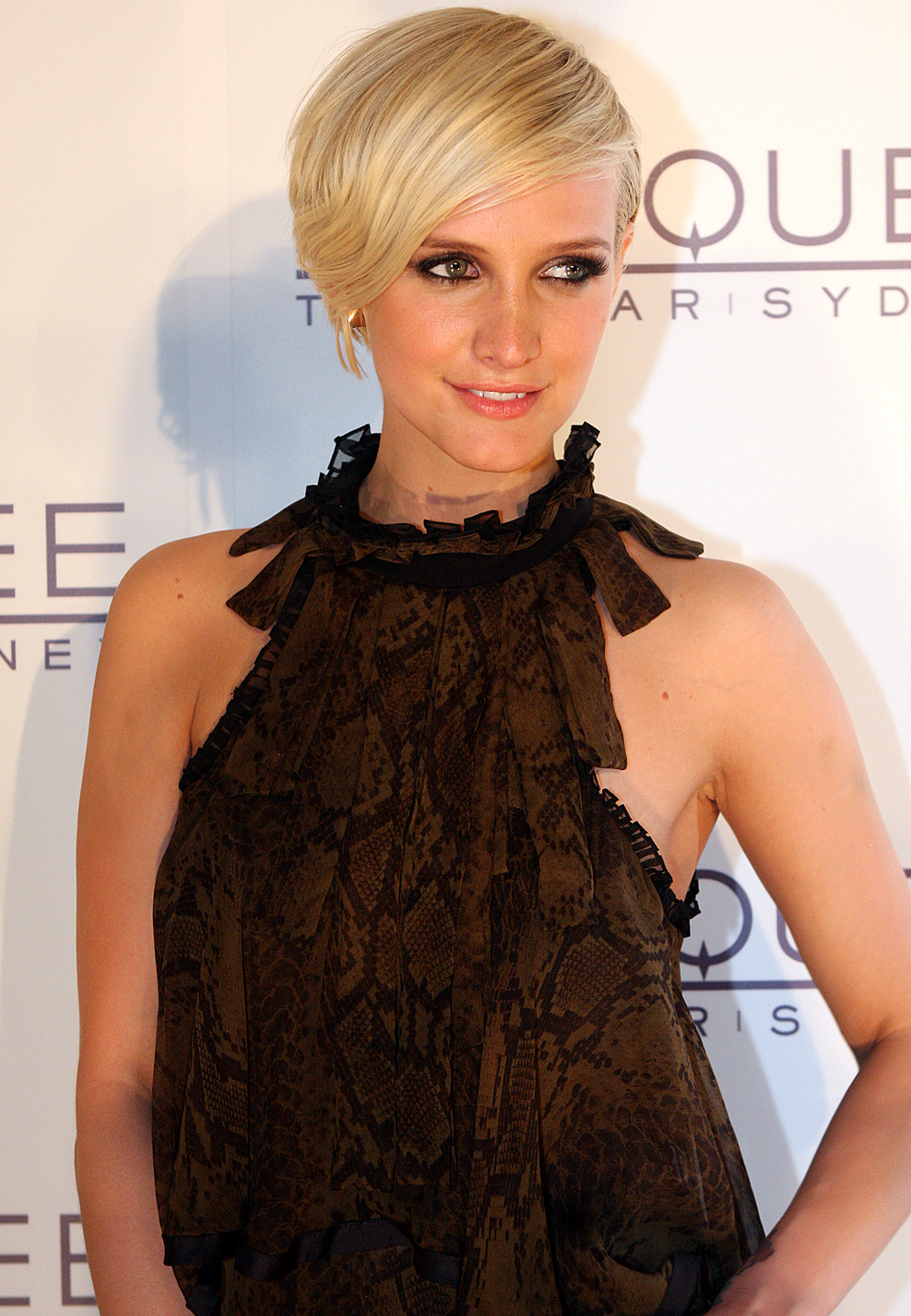
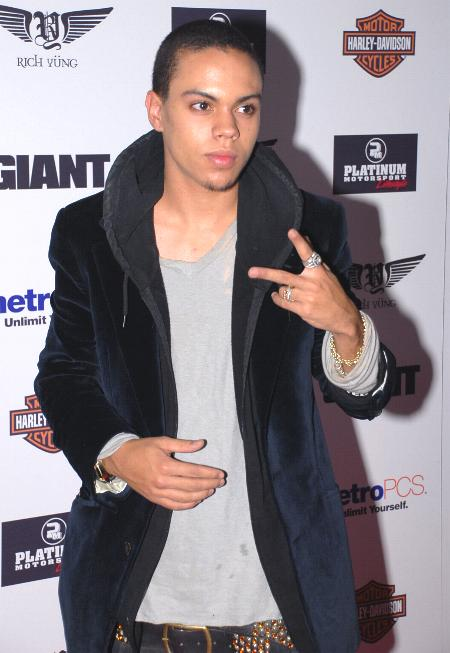
- Ashlee Simpson (left, 2012) and Evan Ross (right, 2007)

Background information
- Origin: Los Angeles, U.S.
- Genres: R&B
- Years active: 2018–2019
- Label: First Access
- Members: Ashlee Simpson; Evan Ross
- Website: Official website

Ashlee + Evan (stylized in all caps) are an American musical duo consisting of married musicians Ashlee Simpson and Evan Ross. They released their debut single, "I Do", on September 7, 2018, two days before the premiere of their reality television series of the same name. Their eponymous debut extended play Ashlee + Evan (EP) was then released on October 12, 2018, through Access Records, and was supported by a tour in select cities across North America in January 2019.

== Discography ==
Song Title	Year	Album
"I Do" (Note: "I Do" peaked at number 16 on the Billboard Digital Songs and number 6 on the Pop Digital Songs charts.)	2018	Ashlee + Evan (Note: "Ashlee + Evan (EP)" peaked at number 17 on the Billboard Soundtrack Albums chart.)
"Paris"	2018	Ashlee + Evan
"Safe Zone"	2018	Ashlee + Evan
"Tonic"	2018	Ashlee + Evan
"I Want You"	2018	Ashlee + Evan
"Home"	2018	Ashlee + Evan
"Phases"	2019	Non-album single
