= Brett Davern =

American actor (born 1983)

- Born: March 16, 1983 (age 43); Edmonds, Washington, U.S.
- Occupation: Actor
- Years active: 2006–present
- Spouse: Tricia Vansant (m. 2013)
- Children: 2

Brett Davern (born March 16, 1983) is an American actor known for his role as Jake Rosati on the MTV series Awkward.

== Early life ==
Davern was born and raised in Edmonds, Washington. His love of theater and acting started at Madrona Elementary School in Edmonds. He then attended Edmonds-Woodway High School. During his Sophomore through Senior summers he would travel to Stagedoor Manor Theatrical Training Center in upstate New York. After graduating high school in 2001. Davern enrolled at the American Musical and Dramatic Academy in New York City.

== Career ==
While living and auditioning in New York City, Davern landed the lead role in his first film as William in Beautiful Ohio, starring alongside William Hurt, Rita Wilson, and Julianna Margulies. He has guest starred on CSI: Miami, Medium, NCIS, In Plain Sight and Cold Case, among other shows.

Since 2011, he played Jake Rosati on Awkward.. The series won a People's Choice Award for favorite cable comedy in 2013.

Davern has appeared in the films The Pool Boys, Born to Race: Fast Track, Love & Mercy and The Stanford Prison Experiment.

In 2016, he starred in season 6 episode 8 of Shameless as "Larry", a maiesiophile who develops an interest in the show's protagonist, Debbie, then a single pregnant teenager.

== Personal life ==
In 2003, Davern began dating former actress and fitness instructor Tricia Vansant. The two were married in March 2013. He has revealed on podcasts that he has a son and a daughter, the latter born in 2017.

In his free time, Davern displays a passion for racing cars. In 2013, he competed in the Toyota Pro/Celebrity Race at the Grand Prix of Long Beach. The race raises funds for Racing for Kids, an organization helping multiple children's hospitals in southern California. After qualifying in 5th position, he managed to finish the race in 2nd place. In 2014, he competed again and won after qualifying on the pole with the fastest time.

In addition to his charity work with Racing for Kids, Davern helps Wounded Warrior Project, Boys & Girls Clubs of America, Stars for Smiles, and Ronald McDonald House.

== Filmography ==
=== Film ===
Year	Title	Role	Notes
2006	Beautiful Ohio	William	
2008	Player 5150	Mike	
2009	The Pool Boys	Alex Sperling	
2010	Case 219	Leonard Gray	
2010	Triple Dog	Whisper	
2012	Junk	Billy	
2013	Movie 43	Bobby Lee Mayflower	Segment: "Victory's Glory"; Nominated - Golden Raspberry Award for Worst Screen Combo (shared with the entire cast)
2014	Born to Race: Fast Track	Danny Krueger	
2014	Love & Mercy	Carl Wilson	
2015	The Stanford Prison Experiment	Hubbie Whitlow	
2015	The Culling	Sean	
2023	Unicorn Boy	Shine	Voice role
2023	Sitting in Bars with Cake	Tyler the Nurse	

=== Television ===
Year	Title	Role	Notes
2008	CSI: Miami	Justin Marsh	Episode: "And How Does That Make You Kill?"
2009	In Plain Sight	Eric	Episode: "Jailbait"
2009–2010	Cold Case	Finn Cooper	Recurring role
2010	The Deep End	Charlie Holloway	Episode: "White Lies, Black Ties"
2010	Medium	Ryan Graff	Episode: "It's a Wonderful Death"
2011–2016	Awkward	Jake Rosati	Main role
2012	NCIS	Kris Taylor	Episode: "The Namesake"
2012	The Finder	Cooper Allison	Episode: "An Orphan Walks Into a Bar"
2016	Chosen	Paul	Episodes: "The Fixers", "The Hunters" and "Collision Course"
2016	Shameless	Larry	Episode: "Be a Good Boy. Come For Grandma."
2016	Major Crimes	Dwight Darnell	4 episodes
2016–2017	Relationship Status	Justin	6 episodes
2017	Party Boat	Max	TV movie
2019	Hell Den	Various	Episode: "The Foot Fist Bae" (voice role)
2019	NCIS: Los Angeles	Petty Officer Stephen Lamb	Episode: "Yellow Jack"
2023	Tacoma FD	Cousin Terry	Episode: "Who Gives A-Shift?"
2024	A Very Vermont Christmas	Ethan	TV movie
