= Leona Naess =

English singer

- Born: Leona Kristina Næss
- Origin: London, England
- Genre: Alternative rock
- Occupation: Singer-songwriter
- Instrument: Guitar
- Years active: 1998–present
- Labels: Outpost; MCA; Geffen; Verve Forecast; Polydor
- Website: www.leonanaess.org

Leona Kristina Naess (also spelt Næss) is an English singer and songwriter. She released her debut album, Comatised, in March 2000, which produced the single "Charm Attack" (Adult Top 40 #29).

Naess was raised in London, the daughter of Swedish interior designer Filippa Kumlin D'Orey and Norwegian mountaineer and businessman Arne Næss Jr. She attended the Purcell School in Hertfordshire, studying music composition, and later graduated from New York University with a degree in anthropology. Naess began her music career performing in New York City venues and released her first album, Comatised, in 2000.

Naess has two children and maintains a close relationship with her ex-stepmother, Diana Ross, and her former stepsisters.

== Biography ==
=== Early life ===
Naess was raised in London. She is the daughter of Filippa Kumlin D'Orey, a Swedish interior designer, and the late Arne Næss Jr., a Norwegian mountaineer and business magnate, who was of Norwegian and German descent. She has two full siblings: an older brother, Christoffer, and a sister, Katinka, from that marriage. Her great-uncle was the Norwegian philosopher Arne Næss. Naess was 7 years old when her parents divorced in 1982. She attended school in London's Chelsea area while growing up, and later attended the Purcell School in Hertfordshire, where she studied music composition. Her father married African-American entertainer and global music sensation Diana Ross in 1986 and had two boys, her half-brothers Ross Naess and Evan Ross. Naess would often travel to their Connecticut home, where she was close with her stepmother and stepsisters Chudney Ross, Rhonda Ross Kendrick, and actress Tracee Ellis Ross. Her father and Ross divorced in 2000, and Naess also has two other half-brothers, Nicklas and Louis Naess, from her father's subsequent marriage to Camilla Astrup.

A paternal aunt to Naess' mother Filippa Kumlin was Elsa Kumlin, married Crafoord, and grand mother to Swedish singer/songwriter Wille Crafoord, making the two pop stars second cousins.

Naess received her first guitar at the age of 14, a gift from her mother. The first song she learned to play was "The Cross" by Prince. She soon began writing her own songs. In addition to Julie Andrews in the musicals Mary Poppins and The Sound of Music, her early influences were 1980s British rock. Naess soon found inspiration in the contemporary singer-songwriters Tracy Chapman, Sinéad O'Connor, and Edie Brickell, as well as in Joni Mitchell and Carole King. Her other early musical influences include Patti Smith, Bob Dylan, The Rolling Stones, Bruce Springsteen and John Lennon.

=== Career ===
At the age of 18, Naess moved to New York City to study music at New York University, she later switched her major, receiving a degree in anthropology. A resident of Greenwich Village, she began performing with her guitar at open mics and was soon performing regularly in coffeehouses, bars and clubs like The Bitter End around Lower Manhattan, even busking at times. She appeared on a reality TV show on Channel 4 in 1993 called The Next Big Thing.

A friend, who was an intern at Sony Records, invited an executive to see Naess perform. Soon, a number of record companies were interested in signing her. She signed with producer Scott Litt's record label, Outpost Records, at the age of 22, shortly after graduating from NYU.

Naess began work on her first album in 1998, which was completed in June 1999. A series of business mergers postponed the album, meanwhile the Outpost label went out of business. The head of MCA Records, another division of the Universal Music Group of which Outpost had become part of, brought her contract over to MCA. Naess's first album, Comatised, was released in March 2000. Naess continued to develop as a performer during the delays. Comatised produced the single "Charm Attack" (Adult Top 40 #29), which was also featured in the teen comedy film Whatever It Takes. She appeared as a model for Calvin Klein prior to the release of the album. Naess soon released her second album, I Tried to Rock You But You Only Roll (2001), produced by Swedish producer Martin Terefe.

In 2002, Naess recorded backing vocals on Counting Crows album Hard Candy, primarily on the song "Black and Blue". She signed with Geffen Records and released her third album, Leona Naess (2003), produced by Ethan Johns. The album was a new direction for Naess with its stripped-down instrumentation. A song from this album, "Ballerina", appeared in the first season of the Showtime program, Weeds (2005), in the episode entitled "Dead in the Nethers". Another song from her third album, "Christmas", also appeared in The O.C. on the episodes, "The Debut", and the episode "The Chrismukkah Almost That Wasn't, as well as the soundtrack Music from the OC: Mix 3. In 2004, her song "Calling" was featured on the soundtrack to Bridget Jones: The Edge of Reason.

In January 2004, Naess' father died in a climbing accident in South Africa. Devastated by the loss, she withdrew from music and moved back to London to live with her mother. Naess was dropped from her record label, split with her manager, and considered going back to school. Eventually, she resumed songwriting and began collaborating with music producer Samuel Dixon. Naess released a fourth album, Thirteens, on 16 September 2008 with Verve Forecast Records in the US The title refers to thirteen lo-fi home-recorded albums that Naess created over approximately two years before the album's release, although Naess has stated that the title has another meaning, which is a secret. The album consists of first takes, which were then overdubbed. A single, "Heavy Like Sunday", was released on 2 June 2008 on Blue Flowers Records. 500 copies of a 7" vinyl version included a Polaroid picture taken by Naess. The album was released on 11 May 2009 by Polydor Records in the UK.

Naess is featured on the Ray LaMontagne album, Gossip in the Grain (2008), on the songs "A Falling Through" and "I Still Care for You", and toured with LaMontagne in September – November 2008. She has also toured with Eagle-Eye Cherry, David Gray, Travis, Ryan Adams, Emm Gryner, Hem, Josh Rouse, Ben Lee, Badly Drawn Boy, and appeared as part of the 1999 Lilith Fair.

Naess returned to the stage, performing at New York's Rockwood Music Hall in October 2016, her first show in over seven years. She is planning a new album and extensive live shows in 2017.

=== Personal life ===
Naess lives in New York City and frequently travels back to London. She was engaged to singer-songwriter Ryan Adams, but the engagement ended in 2003. Naess wrote on her MySpace blog in January 2010 that she was pregnant, taking a break from music, and had "never been happier". On 4 June 2010, she had a baby boy, and she had her second child in 2011.

She is the sister-in-law of actress Christa Miller, paternal half-sister of actor and musician Evan Ross, and the ex-stepdaughter of musician Diana Ross; with whom she remains close. She is also the former stepsister of actress Tracee Ellis Ross and singer-songwriter Rhonda Ross Kendrick, with whom she also remains close.

== Discography ==
=== Studio albums ===
- Comatised (2000), MCA
- I Tried to Rock You But You Only Roll (2001), MCA
- Leona Naess (2003), Geffen
- Thirteens (2008), Verve Forecast (US), Polydor (UK)
- Brood X (2022)

=== EPs ===
- Rock You E.P. (2001), MCA

=== Singles ===
- "Charm Attack" (2000), MCA – Adult Top 40 No. 29
- "I Tried to Rock You But You Only Roll" (2001), MCA
- "Mayor of Your Town" (2001), MCA
- "Calling" (2003), Geffen
- "You Old Dog / Just One" (2003), Geffen
- "Ghosts in the Attic" (2007), Leona Naess
- "Heavy Like Sunday" (2008), Blue Flowers
- "Leave Your Boyfriends Behind" (2008), Verve Forecast
- "Name Across the Sky" (2022), Leona Naess
