= Sylvia Jefferies =

American actress

- Born: Sylvia Webster Jefferies; August 14, 1969 (age 56); Greenwood, South Carolina, US
- Occupation: Actress
- Years active: 2002–present
- Children: 1

Sylvia Webster Jefferies (born August 14, 1969) is an American actress, best known for her recurring role as Jolene Barnes in the ABC drama series Nashville .

== Life and career ==
Jefferies was born in Greenwood, South Carolina. She is the daughter of the late James Jefferies, a lawyer and former mayor of Greenwood, and Polly Jefferies, a retired emergency room registered nurse. She attended the American Academy of Dramatic Arts in New York and in following years appeared in stage production and television commercials.

Jefferies is known for her recurring role as Tracy on the HBO comedy series Eastbound & Down (2009-2010). In 2012, Jefferies was cast in recurring role in the ABC drama series Nashville created by Academy Award winner Callie Khouri. She played Jolene Barnes, mother of Hayden Panettiere's character, who is a drug addict. She also appeared in films The Notebook, Halloween II, 96 Minutes, Rob Zombie’s 3 from Hell, and guest starred on One Tree Hill and Surface.

== Filmography ==
=== Film ===
Year	Title	Role	Notes
2002	Leo	College Girl	Uncredited
2004	The Notebook	Rosemary	
2004	Le croisment	Kourina	Short film
2005	End of the Spear	Barbara Youderian	
2006	Walker Payne	Trampy Blonde	
2006	Deja Vu	Reporter	
2008	The Four Children of Tander Welch	Maran Welch	
2009	Halloween II	Misty Dawn	
2010	Domestic Silence	Dr. Lee	Short film
2011	96 Minutes	Kevin's Mom	
2012	Piranha 3DD	Young Mother	
2012	Looper	Neighbor	Uncredited
2016	Christmas in Homestead	Barbara McKeevers	Television film
2017	The Student	Maeve Van Sickle	
2017	This Old Machine	Kay	
2017	Jumanji: Welcome to the Jungle	Jogger's Wife	
2019	Shaft	Once Beautiful Woman	
2019	Dying for a Baby	Mrs. Kittle	Television film
2019	3 from Hell	Heather Starship Galen	
2020	USS Christmas	Sharon	Television film

=== Television ===
Year	Title	Role	Notes
2004	One Tree Hill	Instructor	Episode: "Near Wild Heaven"
2006	Surface	Mrs. Joiner	2 episodes
2009-2010	Eastbound & Down	Tracy	5 episodes
2010	Gimme Shelter	Meth Head	Unsold television pilot
2012-2013, 2014, 2017, 2018	Nashville	Jolene Barnes	17 episodes
2017	Star	Yvonne Turner	Episode: "Boy Trouble"
2021	The Game	Montana	3 episodes
