= The Culling (film) =

- Film poster
- Directed by: Rustam Branaman
- Written by: Rustam Branaman
- Produced by: Colin Bates; Craig Chapman; Joey Tufaro; Peter Fruchtman
- Starring: Jeremy Sumpter; Elizabeth DiPrinzio; Brett Davern; Chris Coy; Linsey Godfrey; Virginia Williams; Johnathon Schaech; Harley Graham
- Cinematography: Frederick Iannone
- Production companies: Silver Lining Media Group; Gold Star Films; Safady Entertainment
- Distributed by: Highland Film Group
- Release date: March 10, 2015
- Running time: 81 minutes
- Country: United States
- Language: English
- Budget: $860,000

The Culling is a 2015 American thriller film about five college students who encounter a strange little girl with a secret. It is directed and written by Rustam Branaman and starring Jeremy Sumpter, Elizabeth DiPrinzio, Brett Davern, Chris Coy, Linsey Godfrey, Virginia Williams, Johnathon Schaech, and Harley Graham.

== Plot ==
The film opens on a girl running in fear from something chasing her. The screen cuts to black as she cries out, and an evil cackling is heard.

Five college students Emily (Elizabeth Di Prinzio), Tyler (Jeremy Sumpter), Sean (Brett Davern), Hank (Chris Coy), and Amanda (Linsey Godfrey) go on a road trip. While stopping to get something to eat, they come across a young girl, Lucy (Harley Graham), carrying a doll named Jade. Lucy says she was with her grandfather, but she lost him and can't get back home with her parents by herself. The group gives her a ride to a farmhouse that's very out of the way. Emily takes Lucy up to the house to find it empty. Lucy takes Emily up to her room, where there are several dolls that have been broken in various ways.

The group decides they can't leave Lucy by herself, and soon, a truck drives up, carrying Lucy's parents, Val (Virginia Williams) and Wayne (Johnathon Schaech). Initially angry with the students for entering their home uninvited, Lucy's parents invite them to eat, drink and smoke weed with them while Lucy is in bed. Val goes to chop more firewood and accidentally injures her leg with the axe. Wayne chides her for not paying attention. Wayne takes Val to the hospital while Lucy stays with Emily and her friends.

The group goes searching for Amanda, who has shut herself in a bedroom and won't answer them, and also discover that Lucy is no longer in her room. They look for Lucy outside, and Sean encounters an ominous figure that chases him. Terrified, Sean goes back to the others, and insists they leave, even though they haven't found Lucy yet. He breaks open the door to Amanda, and finds her seemingly suffering the effects of a drug overdose caused by a painkiller she stole from the bathroom earlier. Sean and Hank leave in the group's car to take Amanda to the hospital while Emily and Tyler stay behind. While driving, they see a girl standing in the road who appears to be Lucy. Sean swerves to avoid her, causing a crash that kills Sean and leaves Hank stuck in the car. Hank tells Amanda to go back to the house for help.

Crying, Amanda begins to run back to the house and falls into a pit containing several dead bodies, one of them being the girl who was chased at the beginning of the film. Meanwhile, Hank frees himself from the car and returns to the house. He gets a shotgun from the house and the three begin to experience supernatural occurrences inside, including a shadowy figure that causes Tyler to shoot Hank with the gun.

Tyler leaves the house to get help, and finds Amanda in the pit. He tries to pull her out before she is killed by an axe thrown into her face. Tyler turns to see Val and Wayne. Wayne uses a knife to stab Tyler and kicks him into the pit of bodies.

Emily also leaves the house, and is picked up in the truck by Val and Wayne. They return to the house and Emily declares that Hank has died from his injuries. Val and Wayne reveal their evil sides to Emily and attempt to harm her. Hank appears and cuts Val's throat, saving Emily. Emily manages to escape outside the house and into the barn, where she discovers many creatures in the appearance of children locked up.

Wayne arrives and knocks Emily unconscious and explains the reasons for his actions. In order to save Lucy's life when she was trapped in a burning building, he was tasked by an unknown entity into creating an army of demonic children by using the bodies of people like Emily. While he is focusing on the ritual, Emily awakens and sets him on fire and drives away in his truck. As Wayne is lying on the ground burning, an evil creature comes up out of his body ominously looking towards Emily. A hysterical Emily floors the gas pedal and peels away. Emily is still driving when the sun comes up. The camera zooms into the back of the pickup truck where we see Lucy sitting. Then a water color picture is shown that depicts a dark haired woman presumably driving and a drawing of a blond girl with what appears to be a hook for an arm before the screen cuts to black, leaving Emily's fate unknown.

== Cast ==
- Jeremy Sumpter as Tyler
- Elizabeth DiPrinzio as Emily
- Brett Davern as Sean
- Chris Coy as Hank
- Linsey Godfrey as Amanda
- Virginia Williams as Val
- Johnathon Schaech as Wayne
- Harley Graham as Lucy

== Production ==
Filming started on September 11, 2011.
