= 10 Rules for Sleeping Around =

2013 film by Leslie Greif

- Theatrical release poster
- Directed by: Leslie Greif
- Written by: Leslie Greif
- Produced by: Harry Basil; Leslie Greif; Vince Maggio; Herb Nanas
- Starring: Jesse Bradford; Chris Marquette; Tammin Sursok; Virginia Williams; Reid Ewing
- Cinematography: Tom Priestley Jr.
- Edited by: Richard Nord
- Music by: Nathan Matthew David; Alan Ett
- Production company: Thinkfactory Media
- Distributed by: Screen Media Films
- Release dates: August 13, 2013 (Netherlands); April 4, 2014
- Running time: 94 minutes
- Country: United States
- Language: English

10 Rules for Sleeping Around is a 2013 American screwball romantic sex comedy film written, produced, and directed by Leslie Greif and starring Jesse Bradford, Chris Marquette, Tammin Sursok, Virginia Williams and Reid Ewing.

== Synopsis ==
The film is about two couples whose sexual escapades land them in a tangle of lies. By following ten simple rules, 20-somethings Vince and Cameron spice up their relationship by sleeping around. But when their straitlaced friends get engaged, their relationship gets turned upside down.

== Cast ==
- Jesse Bradford as Vince Johnson
- Chris Marquette as Ben Roberts
- Tammin Sursok as Kate Oliver
- Virginia Williams as Cameron Johnson
- Bryan Callen as Owen Manners
- Lucia Sola as Gabriella "Gabi" Jobim
- Wendi McLendon-Covey as Emma Cooney
- Michael McKean as Jeffrey Fields
- Reid Ewing as Hugh Fields
- Simone Griffeth as Barbara
- Corey Saunders as Matt
- Bill Bellamy as Dwayne
- Mills Allison as Duncan
- Zakiya Alta Lee as Tanisha
- Jamie Renee Smith as Nikki
- Molly McCook as Jaymee
- Leslie Greif as Foreman Joe
- Michael Corbett as himself

== Release ==
10 Rules for Sleeping Around was first released via DVD in the Netherlands on August 13, 2013, before arriving in the United States, on April 4, 2014.

=== Critical reception ===
On Rotten Tomatoes, the film has a 0% rating based on reviews from 8 critics. On Metacritic it has a score of 1 out of 100 based on reviews from 5 critics, indicating "overwhelming dislike". It is one of ten films to hold this rating of 1; the other nine being Bio-Dome, Chaos, inAPPropriate Comedy, Not Cool, The Singing Forest, The Garbage Pail Kids Movie, Death of a Nation, Hardbodies, and United Passions.

John DeFore of The Hollywood Reporter calls the film "a numbingly unfunny sex farce." 1NFLUX Magazine's review was slightly more positive, giving the film a C+.
