= Leona Naess (album) =

Studio album by Leona Naess
- Released: 16 September 2003
- Genre: Rock
- Length: 45:22
- Label: Geffen
- Producer: Ethan Johns

Leona Naess chronology
I Tried to Rock You But You Only Roll (2001)	Leona Naess (2003)	Thirteens (2008)

Professional ratings
Review scores
Source	Rating
AllMusic	4.5/5 stars
Entertainment Weekly	B+
The Rolling Stone Album Guide	4/5 stars
Splendid	favourable
USA Today	3/5 stars

Leona Naess is the third album by Leona Naess, released in 2003. It is her first to be released through Geffen Records. The album was a critical success, receiving a four-and-a-half star rating from AllMusic, and was chosen as one of AllMusic's Album Picks. One of the tracks, "Christmas", also appeared on the Music from the OC: Mix 3, and the album reached 43 on the US Top Heatseekers chart in 2003.

A promotion-only version of the album packaged with its commercial release included a bonus DVD featuring interviews with Naess and footage of the recording sessions. The package also included a heart-shaped metal locket, a pressed leaf and a pencil sketch of Naess. The main album is also part of the package although a slightly different master with a different track order.

"Calling" was released as a single from this album. It was announced in December 2006 that "Ballerina" was re-recorded with Tori Amos producing and providing piano for a possible future single release.

== Track listing ==
All songs written by Leona Naess except as indicated.

1. "Calling" – 3:45
2. "Don't Use My Broken Heart" – 3:51
3. "He's Gone" – 4:15
4. "Star Signs" – 4:52
5. "Ballerina" – 4:48 (Naess, Ethan Johns, Richard Causon)
6. "Dues to Pay" – 5:05
7. "Yes, It's Called Desire" – 3:22
8. "How Sweet" – 3:57
9. "Home" – 3:44
10. "Christmas" – 3:43
11. "One Kind of Love" – 3:56
