= Case 219 =

- Directed by: James Bruce
- Written by: James Bruce
- Based on: Shooter by Walter Dean Myers
- Produced by: Taylor Nichols; Christian Faber; James Bruce
- Starring: Evan Ross; Leven Rambin; Taylor Nichols; Brett Davern; Melora Walters; Harold Perrineau
- Cinematography: Mark Kohl
- Edited by: James Bruce
- Music by: We 3-Kings
- Production company: Big Love Studios
- Release date: April 22, 2010 (Atlanta Film Festival)
- Running time: 92 minutes
- Country: United States
- Language: English

Case 219 is a 2010 American drama film written and directed by James Bruce, based on the 2004 novel Shooter by Walter Dean Myers. It stars Evan Ross, Leven Rambin, Taylor Nichols, Brett Davern, Melora Walters, and Harold Perrineau.

== Plot ==
17-year-old Leonard Gray goes on a high school shooting rampage, killing one student and injuring scores more before turning the gun on himself. Using documentary style interviews, Case 219 examines the interconnected relationships among the shooter, his friends, their tormentors at school, and their parents. The film unfolds through the eyes of a Los Angeles Times journalist researching a story for the tenth anniversary of this tragedy, and in watching the interviews we discover the reporter's own shocking secret.

== Cast ==
- Evan Ross as Cameron Porter
- Leven Rambin as Carla Evans
- Taylor Nichols as Richard Ewing
- Brett Davern as Leonard Gray
- Melora Walters as Victoria Lash
- Harold Perrineau as Franklyn Bonner

== Releases ==
The film has been screened at seven different film festivals, premiering at the Atlanta Film Festival.
