= Comatised =

Studio album by Leona Naess
- Released: 14 March 2000
- Genre: Rock
- Length: 58:23
- Label: MCA
- Producer: Scott Litt, Tommy D

Leona Naess chronology
Comatised (2000)	I Tried to Rock You But You Only Roll (2001)

Professional ratings
Review scores
Source	Rating
Allmusic	3/5 stars
Entertainment Weekly	C+
Phoenix New Times	(favorable)
PopMatters	(favorable)
The Rolling Stone Album Guide	3/5 stars

Comatised is the 2000 debut album by Leona Naess, produced by MCA Records. The tracks "Charm Attack" and "Lazy Days" were featured in the teen comedy film Whatever It Takes and the primetime drama The O.C., respectively. The single "Charm Attack" reached #29 on the Billboard Adult Top 40.

== Track listing ==
1. "Lazy Days" – 5:11
2. "Charm Attack" – 4:24
3. "Chase" – 3:19
4. "Lonely Boy" – 6:03
5. "Anything" – 4:06
6. "Chosen Family" – 3:47
7. "Comatised" – 3:56
8. "All I Want" – 3:43
9. "Northern Star" – 4:02
10. "Earthquake" – 4:13
11. "New York Baby" – 4:46
12. "Paper Thin" – 10:47
- "New York Baby" (Alternate Mix) is a hidden track at the end of the album.
- "The Moon and I" is a bonus track on the Japanese version of the album.
