= Robert Ellis Silberstein =

American music executive and businessman

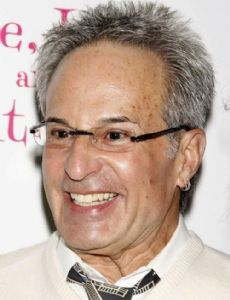
- Silberstein in 2014
- Born: January 5, 1946 (age 80); Elberon, New Jersey, U.S.
- Other name: Bob Ellis
- Occupation: Music executive
- Spouse: Diana Ross (m. 1971; div. 1977)
- Children: 3, including Rhonda & Tracee

Robert Ellis Silberstein (born January 5, 1946), also known as Bob Ellis, is an American music executive and businessman. During his career, he managed many musicians, including Billy Preston, Rufus, the Rolling Stones, Ronnie Wood, Meat Loaf, and Status Quo.

== Early life and education ==
Silberstein was born into a family of Jewish garment manufacturers in Elberon, New Jersey. He graduated from West Virginia University and earned a teaching degree.

== Career ==
Bob moved to Los Angeles in late 1969 or early 1970 and met Diana Ross by chance two months later. While both were in a men's shop, Diana asked Bob for help picking out a gift for her then-partner, Motown Industries chairman Berry Gordy. They married shortly thereafter.

Though he never managed his wife, he managed the Rolling Stones' Ronnie Wood; Billy Preston; Meat Loaf; and Chaka Khan, whom he discovered while managing Rufus.

In 2018, he was associated with the short-lived movie ticket subscription startup, MoviePass, and was subsequently named in a lawsuit citing unlawful gender discrimination and sexual harassment.

== Personal life ==
Silberstein was married to Diana Ross from 1971 to 1977. They have two daughters together, Tracee Ellis Ross and Chudney Ross.

Diana Ross has one daughter from a previous relationship, Rhonda Ross Kendrick, whose biological father is Motown founder Berry Gordy, and who was born seven months after Silberstein and Ross married. Silberstein knowingly adopted her as his own.

Silberstein is currently married to a woman named Susan.
