= Evan Ross =

American actor and musician (born 1988)

Evan Ross-Næss
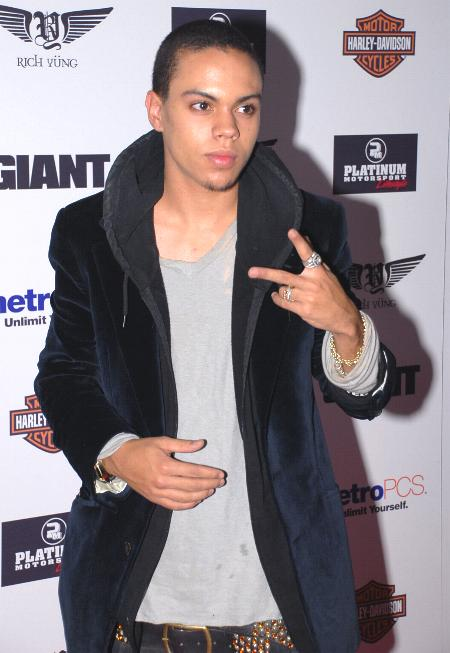
- Ross in November 2007
- Born: Evan Olav Næss; August 26, 1988 (age 38); Greenwich, Connecticut, U.S.
- Occupations: Actor; musician
- Years active: 1999; 2005–present
- Spouse: Ashlee Simpson (m. 2014)
- Children: 2
- Parents: Arne Næss Jr.; Diana Ross
- Relatives: Barbara Ross-Lee; (aunt); Rhonda Ross Kendrick; (half-sister); Tracee Ellis Ross; (half-sister); Leona Naess; (half-sister)

Evan Olav Ross-Næss (born August 26, 1988) is an American actor and musician. He made his acting debut in the comedy-drama film ATL (2006), and has since starred in the films Pride (2007), According to Greta (2009), Mooz-lum (2010), 96 Minutes (2011), Supremacy (2014), and The Hunger Games: Mockingjay – Part 1 (2014) and Part 2 (2015).

On television, Ross had a recurring role as Charlie Selby in the season 3 of The CW's teen drama series 90210 and a regular role as Angel Rivera in the season 2 of Fox's musical drama series Star. Ross also starred on ABC's procedural drama series Wicked City as Diver Hawkes. As a musician, he released his first single "Yes Me" in February 2011, and his second single "How To Live Alone" in May 2015.

Ross is the son of Diana Ross and shipping magnate and mountaineer Arne Næss Jr. He has been married since 2014 to singer-songwriter Ashlee Simpson, with whom he has two children.

== Early life ==
Ross was born Evan Olav Næss in Greenwich, Connecticut, to businessman and mountaineer Arne Næss Jr., who was Norwegian, and entertainer Diana Ross, who is African-American. His paternal great-uncle was Norwegian philosopher Arne Næss.

Ross' parents divorced in 2000. He has one older full brother, Ross Næss, and three older maternal half-sisters, Rhonda, whose biological father is Berry Gordy, and Tracee and Chudney from his mother's marriage to Robert Ellis Silberstein. He also has three older paternal half-siblings from his father's first marriage, Christoffer, Katinka, and Leona, and two younger paternal half-brothers from his father's third marriage, Nicklas and Louis. In January 2004, Ross' father was killed at age 66 in a mountain climbing accident near Cape Town.

== Career ==
=== Acting ===
Ross began his career as an actor while a student at Greenwich High School. His first major role was in the film, ATL, released in March 2006, in which he co-starred with rappers T.I. and Big Boi. Ross received rave reviews for his role as troubled teenager Amare McCarter in the HBO television film Life Support, starring alongside Queen Latifah and his real-life half-sister Tracee Ellis Ross, who portrayed his elder sister in the film. Ross later co-starred in the biographical film Pride, in which he portrayed a good-natured teen with a speech impediment. He also appeared (uncredited) in an episode of Girlfriends. The episode, titled "What's Black-A-Lackin'?", also guest-starred Chrisette Michele, and was directed by his half-sister Tracee.

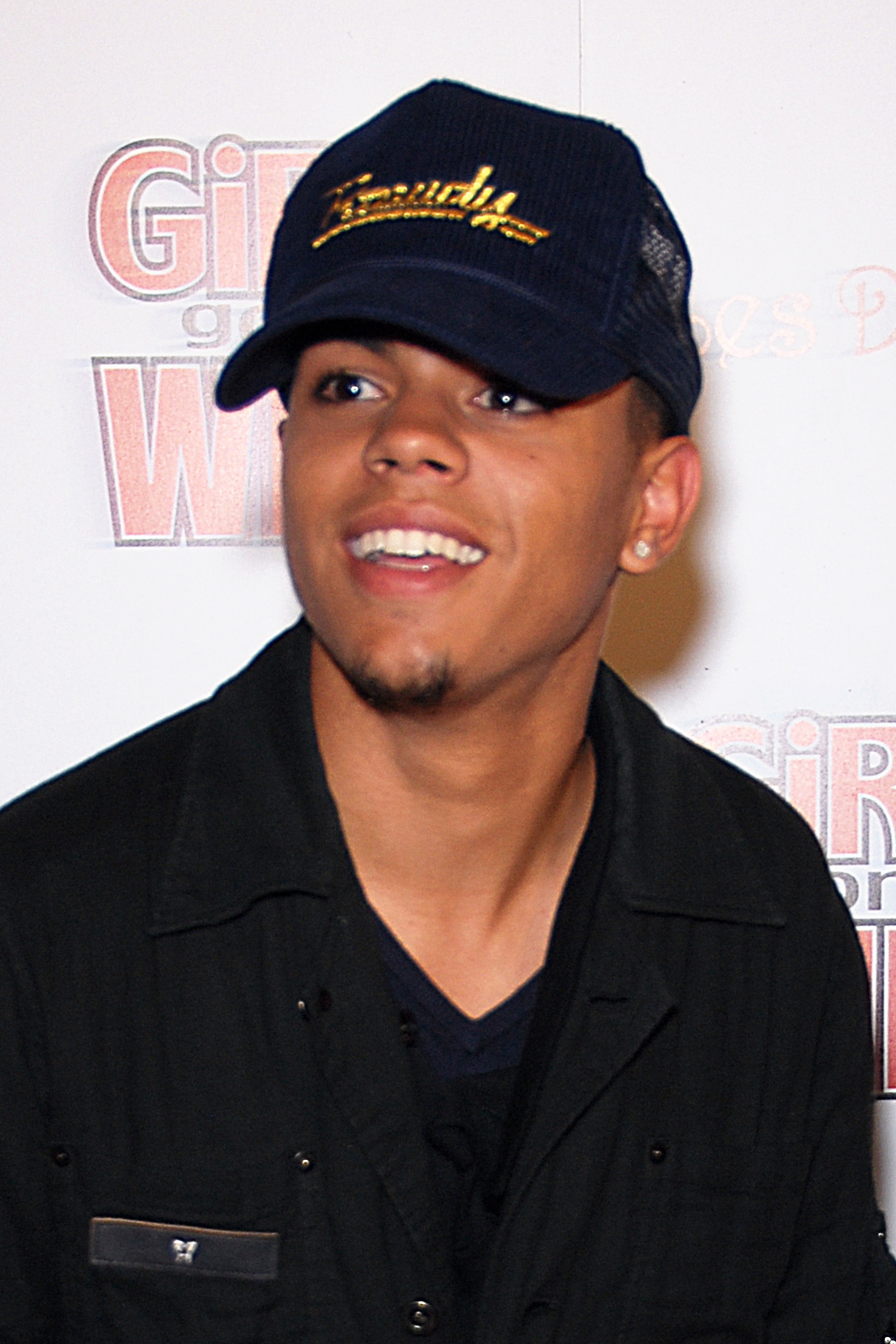
Ross at a Girls Gone Wild magazine party, June 4, 2008

Ross has appeared in several other films, including the thriller Linewatch with Cuba Gooding Jr. (2008), the drama Gardens of the Night (2008), and the crime drama film Life Is Hot in Cracktown (2009). He then starred as Julie, the love interest of Hilary Duff's character, in the 2009 comedy-drama film According to Greta. Ross has also appeared in The Notorious B.I.G. music video for the song "Nasty Girl" (2005), and the Lionel Richie music video for the song "Just Go" (2009).

In 2010, Ross joined the cast of The CW's teen drama series 90210 in its third season, portraying Liam Court's (Matt Lanter) half-brother and the love interest to Annie Wilson, played by Shenae Grimes-Beech. That same year, he appeared in Case 219, and the critically acclaimed film festival winner Mooz-lum, also starring Danny Glover and Nia Long. He then starred in the comedy-drama The Family Tree (2011) and co-starred alongside Brittany Snow in the thriller 96 Minutes, which was released April 28, 2012, in select theaters. Ross won the Breakout Acting Award at SXSW for his performance in the film.

In 2012, Ross had a supporting role in the Jay and Mark Duplass-directed comedy-drama Jeff, Who Lives at Home. The following year, he portrayed music producer Dallas Austin in the VH1 biopic CrazySexyCool: The TLC Story, about the 1990s Atlanta girl group TLC (the film was named after their second album CrazySexyCool). He then appeared in the drama film All the Wilderness (2014), which premiered at SXSW; the Courteney Cox-directed comedy-drama Just Before I Go (2014), which premiered at the Tribeca Film Festival; and the drama film Supremacy (2014), which premiered at the LA Film Festival.

Also in 2014, Ross portrayed the role of Messalla in The Hunger Games: Mockingjay – Part 1, released on November 21. He reprised the role in Mockingjay – Part 2, which was released on November 20, 2015. In July 2015, he joined the cast of ABC's crime drama series Wicked City, portraying crime scene paparazzo Diver Hawkes, replacing Darrell Britt-Gibson in the role. Beginning in 2017, Ross had a major role as Angel Rivera in the second and third seasons of Fox's drama series Star. In 2018, Ross starred in a reality show alongside his wife Ashlee Simpson Ross called Ashlee+Evan, which lasted 6 episodes.

In 2026, Ross competed in season fourteen of The Masked Singer as "Stingray". He was eliminated on "Star Trek Night" alongside Greg Mathis as "14 Karat Carrot".

=== Music ===
In 2007, Ross began recording his debut album, which was expected to encompass R&B and pop. After four years in the studio, Ross released his single "Yes Me" on February 25, 2011, which was produced by Tony DeNiro and written by DeNiro and Ross. On December 5, 2014, Ross released a sneak preview of another song, "How To Live Alone", on his Instagram account. Ross released the song as a single, featuring rapper T.I., on May 14, 2015. In 2016, Ross was featured on DJWS & Hero's song, "They". Ross also recorded the duets, "Don't Look At Me" and "All I Want" for the series Star with Brittany O'Grady. In 2017, Ross was featured on "Restricted" by Kronic. In 2018, Ross became one-half of the duo, Ashlee + Evan, with his wife. The pair released a duet collaboration, Ashlee + Evan, on October 12, 2018.

== Personal life ==
Ross became engaged to singer-songwriter Ashlee Simpson in January 2014, and the two were married that year on August 30 at his mother's estate in Connecticut. They have two children together, a daughter born in 2015 and a son born in 2020, and Ross is the step-father of Simpson's son with her previous husband, musician Pete Wentz.

== Filmography ==
=== Film ===
Year	Title	Role	Notes
2006	ATL	Anton Swann	
2007	Pride	Reggie Jones	
2008	Gardens of the Night	Donnie	
2008	Linewatch	Little Boy	
2009	Life Is Hot in Cracktown	Romeo	
2009	According to Greta	Julie Robinson	
2009	Black Water Transit	Gary Vermillion	
2010	Case 219	Cameron Porter	
2010	Mooz-lum	Tariq Mahdi	
2011	The Family Tree	Josh Krebs	
2011	96 Minutes	Dre	
2012	Jeff, Who Lives at Home	Kevin	
2013	N.Y.C. Underground	Sam	
2014	All the Wilderness	Harmon	
2014	Just Before I Go	Romeo Semple	
2014	Squatters	AJ	
2014	Supremacy	Anthony Walker	
2014	The Hunger Games: Mockingjay – Part 1	Messalla	
2015	The Hunger Games: Mockingjay – Part 2	Messalla	
2017	The Curse of Buckout Road	Aaron Powell	
2020	Pink Skies Ahead	Cameron	
2021	The United States vs. Billie Holiday	Sam Williams	
2021	She Ball	Mike	Direct to streaming
2022	The Loneliest Boy in the World	Julius	
2023	A Snowy Day in Oakland	Rodney Smalls	

Key
†	Denotes films that have not yet been released

=== Television ===
Year	Title	Role	Notes
1999	Shelly Fisher	Ricky Bender	Television film
2006–2007	All of Us	Danny	3 episodes
2007	Life Support	Amare McCarter	Television film
2008	Girlfriends	Marco	Episode: "What's Black-a-Lackin'?"
2010–2011	90210	Charlie Selby	9 episodes
2011	Luck	Doorman	Episode: "Pilot"
2013	CrazySexyCool: The TLC Story	Dallas Austin	Television film
2015	Wicked City	Diver Hawkes	8 episodes
2017–2019	Star	Angel Rivera	14 episodes
2018	Ashlee+Evan	Himself	Reality Show
2026	The Masked Singer	Himself/Stingray	Season 14 contestant; 4 episodes

=== Music videos ===
Year	Title	Artist
2005	"Nasty Girl"	The Notorious B.I.G.
2009	"Just Go"	Lionel Richie
2018	"Sugar Daddy"	Macy Gray

== Awards and nominations ==
Year	Award/Festival	Category	Nominated work	Result
2008	NAACP Image Awards	Outstanding Actor in a Television Movie, Mini-Series or Dramatic Special	Life Support	Nominated
2011	SXSW Film Festival	Breakthrough Performance	96 Minutes	Won
2012	Black Reel Awards	Best Actor	Mooz-lum	Nominated
2018	Nice International Film Festival	Best Actor	Buckout Road	Nominated
2018	World Music & Independent Film Festival	Best Actor in a Feature Film	Buckout Road	Nominated
