= Rhonda Ross Kendrick =

American singer

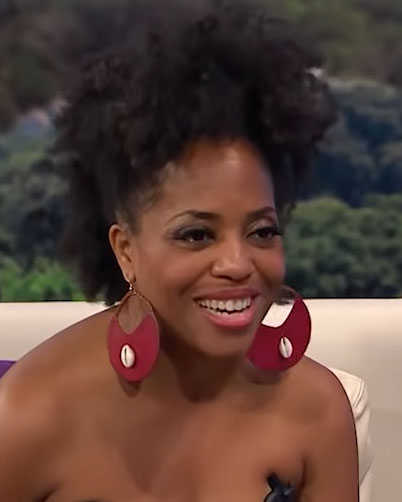
- Kendrick in 2019
- Born: Rhonda Suzanne Silberstein; August 14, 1971 (age 55); Los Angeles, California, U.S.
- Other name: Rhonda Ross
- Education: Brown University
- Occupations: Singer; actress
- Years active: 1985–present
- Spouse: Rodney Kendrick (m. 1997)
- Children: 1
- Parents: Diana Ross (mother); Berry Gordy (father); Robert Ellis Silberstein (adoptive father)
- Relatives: Tracee Ellis Ross (half-sister); Evan Ross (half-brother) Gordy family
- Musical career
- Genres: Jazz; R&B; gospel; soul
- Instrument: Vocals
- Website: rhondarosskendrick.com

Rhonda Ross Kendrick (born Rhonda Suzanne Silberstein; August 14, 1971) is an American singer and actress. Kendrick is the daughter of singer and actress Diana Ross and Motown Records founder Berry Gordy. She was raised by her mother and Robert Ellis Silberstein, who had married Ross before she was born.

== Early life ==
At the time of Rhonda's birth, Diana Ross was married to her first husband, Robert Ellis Silberstein. Ross, Gordy, and Silberstein all knew of Rhonda's parentage. She was publicly presented as the daughter of Ross and Silberstein, and he raised her. When she was 13, she was told Gordy was her biological father. Kendrick has said that the revelation came as a relief. She was beginning to notice physical differences between herself and her younger sisters. The revelation gave her an answer to the situation. Kendrick is the eldest of Diana Ross' five children and the seventh of Berry Gordy's eight biological children. She is a graduate of Brown University.

== Career ==
Ross Kendrick's most famous acting credit is Toni Burrell on Another World. She played the role from 1997 to 1999 and was nominated for a Daytime Emmy Award in 1998. She also appeared in the movie The Personals (1999) with Malik Yoba as well as The Temptations miniseries with her relative Bianca Lawson. In 2004, she released her debut live album Rhonda Ross Live Featuring Rodney Kendrick.

After working for two years as an agent with the firm Citi Habitats, she founded Ross Realty International, a real-estate brokerage firm in New York City in 2008.

In 2013, she joined her mother on the In the Name of Love Tour as the opening act for her concerts. In July 2016, she released her first studio album In Case You Didn't Know. The album spawned the singles "Summer Day" and "In Case You Didn't Know".

During the COVID-19 lockdown, Rhonda contributed her songwriting talents to her mother's Grammy-nominated album Thank You released on Decca Records in late 2021. The album included the single "All is Well" co-written by Rhonda, her mother, and celebrated songwriter and background singer Fred White.

== Personal life ==
On September 14, 1997, she married jazz musician Rodney Kendrick. On August 7, 2009, she gave birth to their son.

== Discography ==
- Rhonda Ross Live Featuring Rodney Kendrick (2004)
- In Case You Didn't Know (2016)

== Filmography ==
Year	Title	Role	Notes
1985	The Last Dragon	7th Heaven Dancer	
1992	Diana Ross Live! The Lady Sings... Jazz & Blues: Stolen Moments	Herself	Television documentary
1994	Out of Darkness	Young Paulie Cooper	Television film
1997–1999	Another World	Toni Burrell	Series regular Nominated — Daytime Emmy Award for Outstanding Younger Actress in a Drama Series (1998)
1997	Oddville, MTV		
1997	Cosby		Episode: "Dating Games"
1998	Franchesca Page		
1998	The Temptations	Maxine	Television miniseries
1999	Personals	Sheila	
2000	Girlfriends	Laurie	Episode: "The Remains of the Date"
2018	Crackdown Big City Blues	Reta	
2023	Protector of the Gods	Goddess Maat	
