= Ashlee + Evan (TV series) =

- Genre: Reality television
- Starring: Ashlee Simpson; Evan Ross
- Country of origin: United States
- Original language: English
- No. of seasons: 1
- No. of episodes: 6

Production
- Executive producer: Jessy Terrero
- Camera setup: Multiple
- Running time: 41–48 minutes
- Production companies: Citizen Jones; Cinema Giants

Original release
- Network: E!
- Release: September 9 – October 14, 2018

Ashlee+Evan was a 2018 American reality television series on E! starring Ashlee Simpson and Evan Ross. In 2019, Simpson stated in an interview with Us Weekly that the show would not be returning for a second season.

== Premise ==
Ashlee+Evan follows Ashlee Simpson and Evan Ross, son of Diana Ross, as they try to balance their lives as new parents and the pressures of living up to their famous family names.

== Cast ==
- Ashlee Simpson
- Evan Ross

== Episodes ==
| No. | Title | Original release date | U.S. viewers (millions) |
|---|---|---|---|
| 1 | "Welcome Home" | September 9, 2018 | 0.47 |
| 2 | "She’s Back" | September 16, 2018 | 0.34 |
| 3 | "Facing Fears" | September 23, 2018 | 0.54 |
| 4 | "Friendly Fire" | September 30, 2018 | 0.45 |
| 5 | "Mom Guilt" | October 7, 2018 | 0.43 |
| 6 | "I Do" | October 14, 2018 | 0.43 |
