= List of Ashlee Simpson concert tours =

The following is a list of tours by American recording artist Ashlee Simpson. At the completion of her 2005, "I Am Me Tour", Simpson had sold 110,000 tickets.

== Autobiography Tour ==
Autobiography Tour
- Tour by Ashlee Simpson
- Associated album: Autobiography
- Start date: February 16, 2005
- End date: April 20, 2005
- Legs: 1
- No. of shows: 37 in North America

Ashlee Simpson concert chronology
- Autobiography Tour (2005); I Am Me Tour (2005)

The Autobiography Tour was the first tour headlined by Ashlee Simpson, in support of her debut album Autobiography; the tour was successful with several dates sold out. The preparation for the tour was featured in Simpson's reality show The Ashlee Simpson Show, along with actual concert footage from the show in Los Angeles. Simpson had six costume changes throughout the concert, and performed a covers medley along with an unreleased song, "Hollywood"

=== Opening acts ===
- Pepper's Ghost
- The Click Five

=== Setlist ===
This setlist is obtained from the February 16, 2005 performance at The Grove of Anaheim, in Anaheim, California. It does not represent all concerts during the course of the tour.

1. "Autobiography"
2. "Nothing New"
3. "Love Me for Me"
4. "Shadow"
5. "Video Sequence"
6. "Harder Everyday"
7. "Undiscovered"
8. "Giving It All Away"
9. "Love Makes the World Go Round"
10. "Hollywood"
11. "Instrumental Sequence"
12. "Surrender (contains excerpts from "Celebrity Skin")
13. "Brass in Pocket" / "Call Me" / "Burning Up"
14. "La La"

Encore

15. "Video Sequence" (contains scene from the film Napoleon Dynamite)
16. "Pieces of Me"

=== Tour dates ===
Date	City	Country	Venue
North America
February 16, 2005	Anaheim	United States	The Grove of Anaheim
February 18, 2005	Los Angeles	United States	Universal Amphitheatre
February 20, 2005	Sacramento	United States	Sacramento Memorial Auditorium
February 22, 2005	San Jose	United States	Event Center Arena
February 24, 2005	Seattle	United States	Paramount Theatre
February 26, 2005	Vancouver	Canada	Queen Elizabeth Theatre
March 1, 2005	Denver	United States	Paramount Theatre
March 3, 2005	Minneapolis	United States	Northrop Auditorium
March 6, 2005	Rosemont	United States	Rosemont Theatre
March 7, 2005	Kansas City	United States	Memorial Hall
March 9, 2005	Cincinnati	United States	Taft Theatre
March 10, 2005	Louisville	United States	The Louisville Palace
March 12, 2005	Columbus	United States	Palace Theatre
March 13, 2005	Toronto	Canada	Massey Hall
March 15, 2005	New York City	United States	Hammerstein Ballroom
March 16, 2005	New York City	United States	Hammerstein Ballroom
March 18, 2005	Boston	United States	Orpheum Theatre
March 19, 2005	Upper Darby Township Township	United States	Tower Theater
March 21, 2005	Toms River	United States	Ritacco Center
March 22, 2005	Cleveland	United States	Palace Theatre
March 24, 2005	Detroit	United States	Fox Theatre
March 25, 2005	Pittsburgh	United States	Benedum Center for the Performing Arts
March 29, 2005	Washington, D.C.	United States	DAR Constitution Hall
March 30, 2005	Norfolk	United States	Norva Theatre
April 1, 2005	Raleigh	United States	Raleigh Memorial Auditorium
April 2, 2005	Charlotte	United States	Ovens Auditorium
April 4, 2005	Duluth	United States	Performing Arts Center at Gwinnett Center
April 6, 2005	North Myrtle Beach	United States	House of Blues
April 8, 2005	Lake Buena Vista	United States	House of Blues
April 9, 2005	Pompano Beach	United States	Pompano Beach Amphitheatre
April 11, 2005	Nashville	United States	Ryman Auditorium
April 12, 2005	Indianapolis	United States	Murat Theatre
April 14, 2005	St. Charles	United States	Family Arena
April 16, 2005	New Orleans	United States	Lakefront Arena
April 17, 2005	Houston	United States	Verizon Wireless Theater
April 19, 2005	Austin	United States	Austin Music Hall
April 20, 2005	Grand Prairie	United States	Nokia Live at Grand Prairie

Cancellations and rescheduled shows

February 2, 2005	Houston, Texas	Verizon Wireless Theater	Rescheduled to April 17, 2005
February 4, 2005	Austin, Texas	Austin Music Hall	Rescheduled to April 19, 2005
February 5, 2005	Grand Prairie, Texas	Nokie Live at Grand Prairie	Rescheduled to April 20, 2005
February 9, 2005	West Valley City, Utah	E Center	Cancelled
February 15, 2005	San Diego, California	Cox Arena at Aztec Bowl	Cancelled
February 19, 2005	Las Vegas	Aladdin Theatre for the Performing Arts	Cancelled
February 22, 2005	San Jose, California	San Jose Center for the Performing Arts	Moved to the Event Center Arena
February 25, 2005	Portland, Oregon	Arlene Schnitzer Concert Hall	Cancelled
March 13, 2005	Toronto, Canada	Hummingbird Centre for the Performing Arts	Moved to Massey Hall

== I Am Me Tour ==
I Am Me Tour
- Tour by Ashlee Simpson
- Associated album: I Am Me
- Start date: November 9, 2005
- End date: December 13, 2005
- Legs: 1
- No. of shows: 18 in North America

Ashlee Simpson concert chronology
- Autobiography Tour (2005); I Am Me Tour (2005); L.O.V.E. Tour (2006)

The I Am Me Tour is the second concert tour by American recording artist, Ashlee Simpson. The tour promoted her second studio album, I Am Me. After completing a series of concerts at various nightclubs, the tour officially started November 2005.

=== Opening acts ===
- October Fall
- Barefoot

=== Setlist ===
1. "I Am Me"
2. "Nothing New"
3. "Coming Back for More"
4. "Roses"
5. "L.O.V.E"
6. "Love Me For Me"
7. "Shadow"
8. "Autobiography"
9. "Catch Me When I Fall"
10. "Eyes Wide Open"
11. "Pieces of Me"
12. "Surrender"
13. "La La"

Encore

14. "Boyfriend"

=== Tour dates ===
Date	City	Country	Venue
North America
November 9, 2005	Portland	United States	State Theatre
November 11, 2005	Hartford	United States	Bushnell Center for the Performing Arts
November 12, 2005	Hampton Beach	United States	Hampton Beach Casino Ballroom
November 14, 2005	Albany	United States	Palace Theatre
November 16, 2005	Reading	United States	Reading Eagle Theater
November 17, 2005	Scranton	United States	Scranton Cultural Center
November 19, 2005	Atlantic City	United States	Borgata Event Center
November 20, 2005	Westbury	United States	North Fork Theatre
November 25, 2005	Sayreville	United States	Starland Ballroom
November 29, 2005	Buffalo	United States	Shea's Performing Arts Center
December 1, 2005	Akron	United States	Thomas Performing Arts Hal
December 2, 2005	Merrillville	United States	Star Plaza Theatre
December 3, 2005	Detroit	United States	State Theatre
December 5, 2005	Syracuse	United States	Landmark Theatre
December 7, 2005	Evansville	United States	The Centre Auditorium
December 10, 2005	Milwaukee	United States	Eagles Ballroom
December 12, 2005	Columbus	United States	Palace Theatre
December 13, 2005	Waukegan	United States	Genesee Theatre

== L.O.V.E. Tour ==
L.O.V.E. Tour
- Tour by Ashlee Simpson
- Associated album: I Am Me
- Start date: June 5, 2006
- End date: July 29, 2006
- Legs: 1
- No. of shows: 29 in North America

Ashlee Simpson concert chronology
- I Am Me Tour (2005); L.O.V.E. Tour (2006)

The L.O.V.E. Tour (initially known as the I Am Me Summer 2006 Tour) is the third concert tour by American recording artist, Ashlee Simpson. The tour promotes the singer's second studio album, I Am Me. It is Simpson's biggest production to date.

=== Opening acts ===
- The Veronicas (select dates)
- Ashley Parker Angel (select dates)

=== Setlist ===
1. ”I Am Me”
2. "Boyfriend"
3. "Burnin Up"
4. "Nothing New"
5. "Autobiography"
6. "Shadow"
7. "Sweet Dreams (Are Made of This)"
8. "Eyes Wide Open"
9. "In Another Life"
10. "Catch Me When I Fall"
11. "Invisible"
12. "Beautifully Broken"
13. "Undiscovered"
14. "Say Goodbye"
15. "Love Me for Me"
16. "Coming Back for More"
17. "Why Don't You Do Right?"
18. "La La"

Encore

18. "L.O.V.E."
19. "Pieces of Me"

=== Tour dates ===
Date	City	Country	Venue
North America
June 5, 2006	Santa Barbara	United States	Santa Barbara Bowl
June 7, 2006	Los Angeles	United States	Greek Theatre
June 8, 2006^{[A]}	Alpine	United States	Viejas Casino-Outlet Center Park
June 10, 2006	Las Vegas	United States	House of Blues
June 11, 2006	Phoenix	United States	Dodge Theatre
June 13, 2006	Greenwood Village	United States	Fiddler's Green Amphitheatre
June 16, 2006	The Woodlands	United States	Cynthia Woods Mitchell Pavilion
June 17, 2006	Dallas	United States	Smirnoff Music Centre
June 20, 2006	Oklahoma City	United States	Ford Center
June 22, 2006	Baton Rouge	United States	Baton Rouge River Center Arena
June 23, 2006	Memphis	United States	Mud Island Amphitheatre
June 25, 2006	Portsmouth	United States	nTelos Wireless Pavilion
June 27, 2006	North Myrtle Beach	United States	House of Blues
June 29, 2006	Glen Allen	United States	Innsbrook Pavilion
June 30, 2006	Bristow	United States	Nissan Pavilion at Stone Ridge
July 2, 2006	Atlantic City	United States	Borgata Event Center
July 5, 2006	Hampton Beach	United States	Hampton Beach Casino Ballroom
July 6, 2006	Hyannis	United States	Cape Cod Melody Tent
July 9, 2006	Wallingford	United States	Chevrolet Theatre
July 11, 2006	Boston	United States	Bank of America Pavilion
July 12, 2006	Philadelphia	United States	Electric Factory
July 14, 2006	Hershey	United States	Star Pavilion
July 17, 2006	Toronto	Canada	Molson Canadian Amphitheatre
July 18, 2006	Darien Center	United States	Darien Lake Performing Arts Center
July 20, 2006	Holmdel Township	United States	PNC Bank Arts Center
July 21, 2006	Bethel	United States	Bethel Woods Center for the Arts
July 23, 2006	Wantagh	United States	Tommy Hilfiger at Jones Beach Theater
July 26, 2006^{[B]}	Wheaton	United States	DuPage County Fairgrounds Grandstand
July 29, 2006	Clarkston	United States	DTE Energy Music Theatre

Festivals and other miscellaneous performances
^{A} Viejas Concerts in the Park
^{B} DuPage County Fair

Cancellations and rescheduled shows

June 18, 2006	North Little Rock, Arkansas	Alltel Arena	Cancelled
July 3, 2006	Ledyard, Connecticut	Fox Theater	Cancelled
July 15, 2006	Pittsburgh, Pennsylvania	Chevrolet Amphitheatre	Cancelled
July 25, 2006	Toledo, Ohio	Toledo Zoo Amphitheater	Cancelled

== Outta My Head Club Tour ==
Outta My Head Club Tour
- Tour by Ashlee Simpson
- Associated album: Bittersweet World
- Start date: January 30, 2008
- End date: March 8, 2008
- Legs: 1
- No. of shows: 13

Ashlee Simpson concert chronology
- L.O.V.E. Tour (2006); Outta My Head Club Tour (2008); Bittersweet World Summer Tour [CANCELED] (2008)

Before the release of Simpson's third studio album Bittersweet World, Simpson embarked on her first club tour to promote the single "Outta My Head (Ay Ya Ya)". The shows lasted around 20 minutes, with between 3 and 4 songs performed. After the release of Bittersweet World, a 12-date summer tour was scheduled; however due to Simpson's pregnancy the tour was canceled.

=== Set list ===
1. L.O.V.E
2. Boys
3. Murder
4. Outta My Head (Ay Ya Ya)

=== Tour dates ===
Outta My Head Club Tour
Date	City	Country	Venue
January 30, 2008	Scottsdale, Arizona	United States	Myste Nite Club
February 1, 2008	San Francisco	United States	Fluid Nite Club
February 9, 2008	Los Angeles	United States	Ritual Nite Club
February 14, 2008	Dallas	United States	Purgatory Night Club
February 15, 2008	Houston	United States	RICH'S Nightclub
February 21, 2008	Chicago	United States	The Underground
February 23, 2008	Las Vegas	United States	Club LAX
February 26, 2008	New York City	United States	Marquee
February 28, 2008	Westbury, New York	United States	Mirage
February 29, 2008	Boston	United States	Gypsy Bar
March 1, 2008	Atlantic City, New Jersey	United States	MIXX Nightclub
March 6, 2008	Tampa, Florida	United States	Honey Pot Nightclub
March 8, 2008	Miami Beach, Florida	United States	Mansion
