= Shiseido =

Japanese cosmetics producer

Shiseido Company, Limited

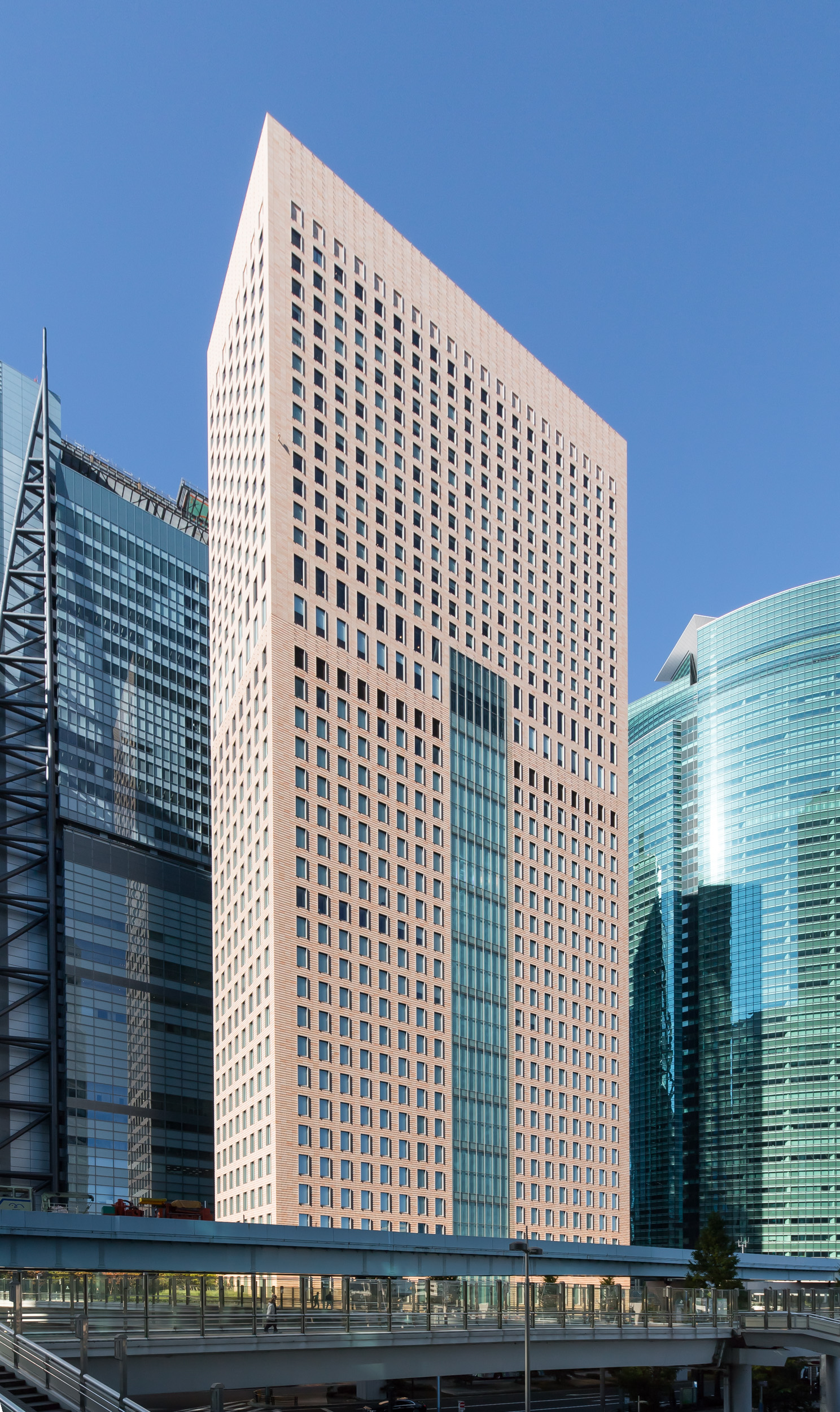
- Headquarters in Minato, Tokyo
- Native name: 株式会社資生堂
- Romanized name: Kabushiki gaisha Shiseidō
- Type: Public (Kabushiki gaisha)
- Traded as: TYO: 4911; Nikkei 225 component TOPIX Large70 component
- ISIN: JP3351600006
- Industry: Consumer goods
- Founded: 17 September 1872; 154 years ago
- Founder: Arinobu Fukuhara
- Headquarters: Higashi-Shinbashi, Minato, Tokyo, Japan; Corporate headquarters
- Area served: Worldwide
- Key people: Masahiko Uotani (President and CEO)
- Products: Skin care; makeup; body care; hair care; fragrance
- Revenue: ▼¥920,888 million (2020)
- Net income: ▼¥−11,660 million (2020)
- Number of employees: 46,000 (2021)
- Subsidiaries: List of subsidiaries
- Website: corp.shiseido.com

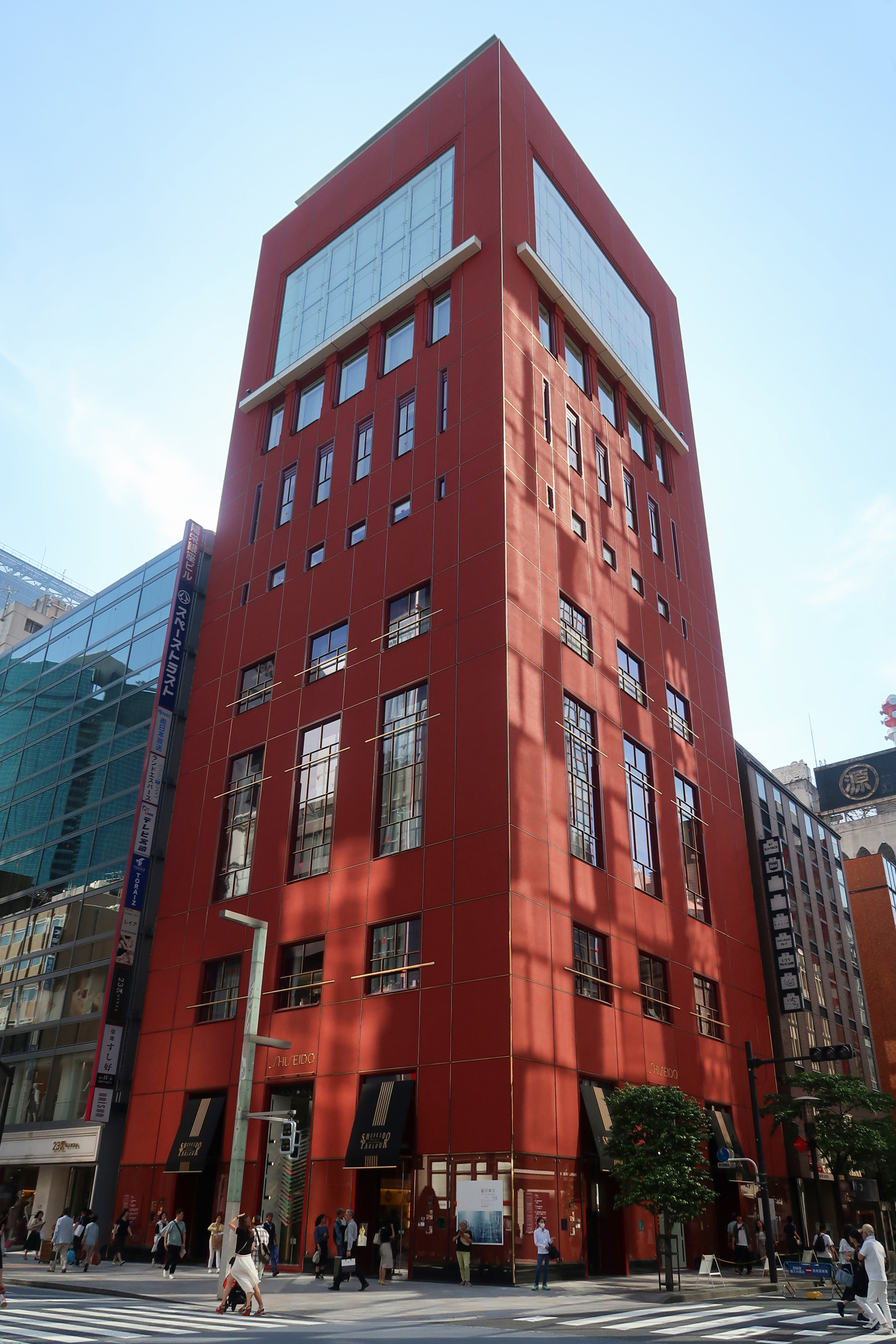
The Shiseido building in Ginza, Tokyo. Its registered office is also in the same ward.

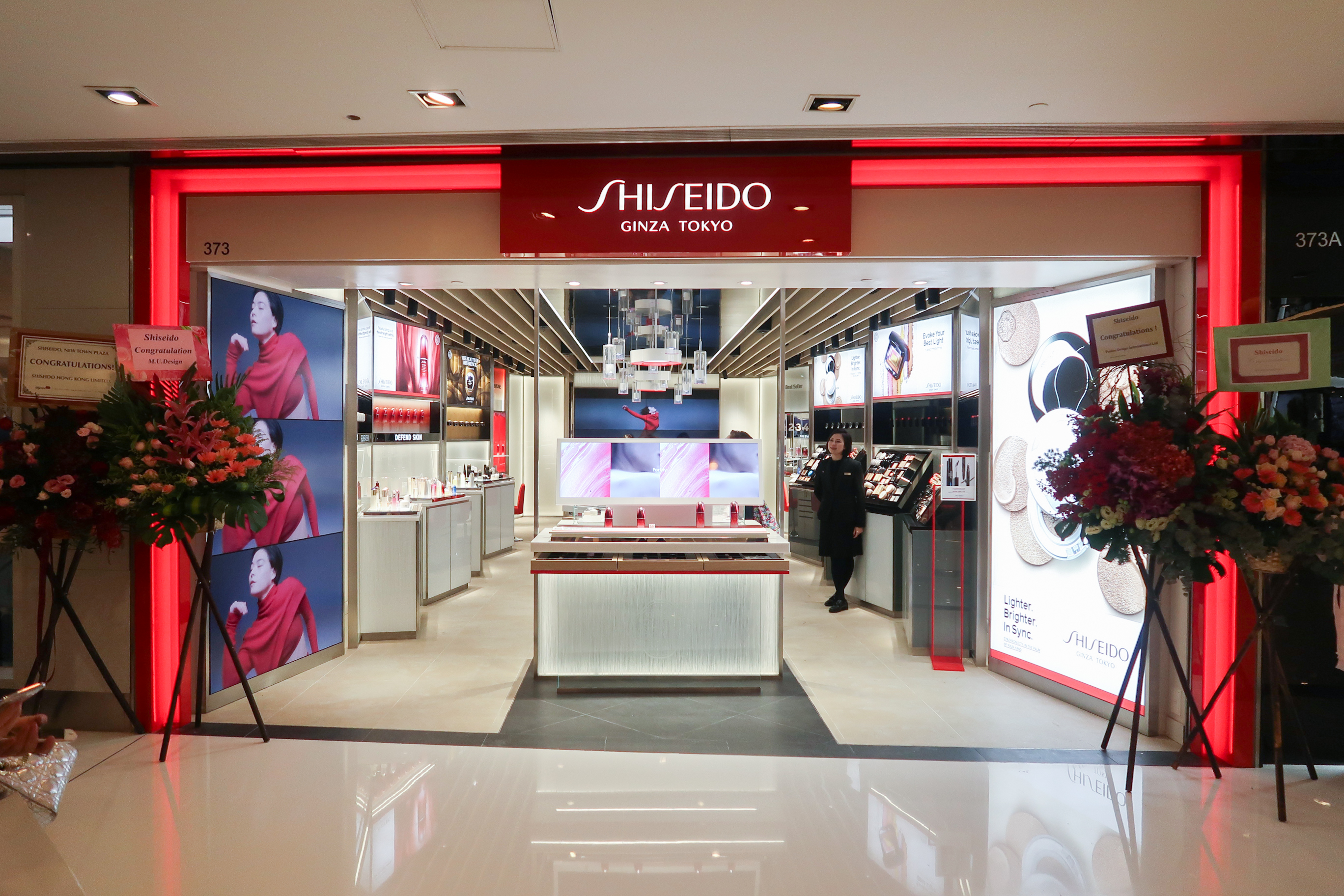
Shiseido store in Hong Kong

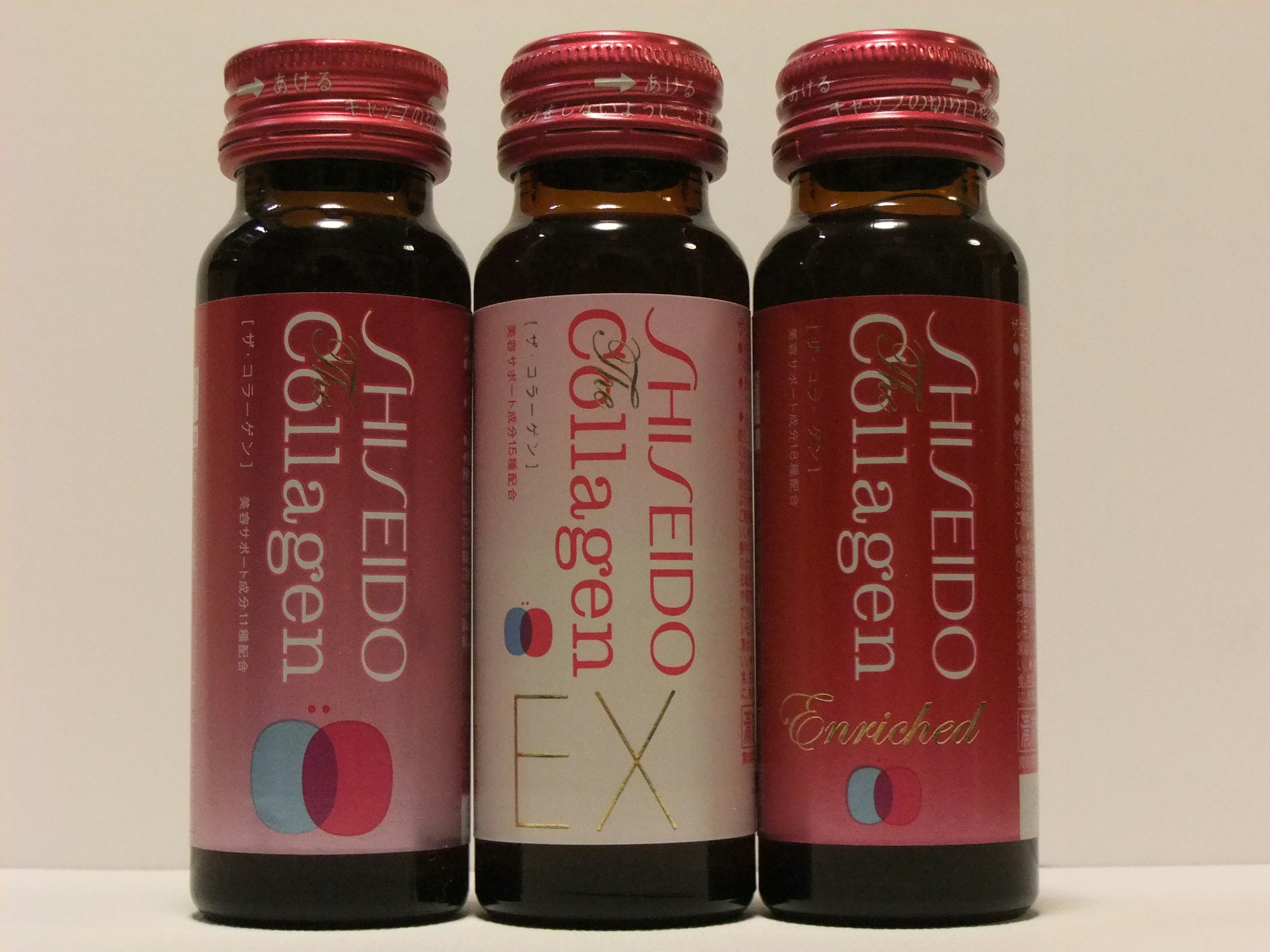
Shiseido collagen, three types

Shiseido Company, Limited (Japanese: 株式会社資生堂, Hepburn: Kabushiki gaisha Shiseidō; pronounced [ɕiseꜜːdoː]) is a Japanese multinational cosmetic company founded in Tokyo, Japan, in 1872. Its product categories include skin care, makeup, body care, hair care, and fragrances.. The company is one of the oldest cosmetic companies in the world. It is the largest cosmetic firm in Japan and the fifth largest cosmetic company in the world. In Japan, Shiseido is available at cosmetic counters at selected department stores and most pharmacies. The company owns numerous brands and subsidiaries worldwide, in addition to its founding label. The company is headquartered in Tokyo, and is traded on the Tokyo Stock Exchange, where it is a constituent of the Nikkei 225 and TOPIX Large70 indices.

== Company history ==
=== Founding ===
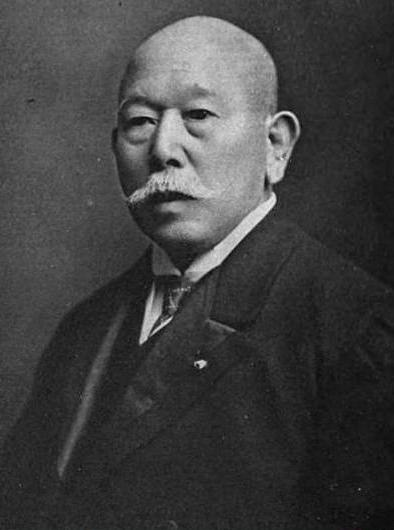
Arinobu Fukuhara (1848–1924), the founder of Shiseido

The name Shiseido comes from a passage in the Chinese classic I Ching (Book of Changes) meaning "praise the virtues of the earth which nurtures new life and brings forth significant values".

Arinobu Fukuhara, former head pharmacist to the Imperial Japanese Navy, established the Shiseido Pharmacy in 1872. After a visit to the United States and Europe, Arinobu added a soda fountain to the store. This later grew into the Shiseido Parlor restaurant business, and eventually led to the introduction of ice cream in Japan.

Arinobu passed on his company to his son, Shinzō Fukuhara, who became the company's second president in 1913. After Shinzō's experience traveling to Europe and the United States, he became interested in advertising as a large selling point for Shiseido which lead him to dedicate extensive resources to the company's design, much of which can be seen from product packaging and magazines from this time.

=== Expansion ===
In 1917, Shiseido introduced Rainbow Face Powder. This was a face powder with seven colors in a period when white face powders were the norm in Japan. In 1923, the company began expanding its store-base.

The company was incorporated as a kabushiki gaisha (Japanese joint-stock company) in 1927. In 2017, Shiseido acquired AI and AR developer Giaran to get ahead in the tech space. Shisheido plans to use Giaran’s beauty simulation technology to boost its digital sales.

=== Early 20th century ===
In 1916, Shiseido transitioned from using historical images of Japanese female beauty to more Western ideals of beauty. The more contemporary images showed women with hair swept up rather than cascading back and incorporated trendy art nouveau style block scripts. This shift in imagery coincided with increasing Western influence in Japan, allowing Shiseido to capitalize on this cultural change.

The Ginza district burned during the Kanto earthquake of 1923. This incident and the great depression in the 1930s, caused a decrease in sales of Shiseido. Shiseido partnered with stores to form the Shiseido Cosmetics Chain Store System. Therefore, consumers could rest assured that they could purchase Shiseido products at the same price at any store. In 1932, the representative Shiseido brand of top class cosmetic products of the time, De Luxe, was born. Following the outbreak of World War II, the De Luxe brand was considered an extravagance and production ceased. However, it was re-launched in 1951, when the economy began to recover. Shiseido started to expand its cosmetics markets to the international market in the 1950s to 1980s.

=== Reformation ===
In 2021, Shiseido sold its personal care business to a company held by British equity firm CVC Capital Partners, Shiseido also transferred all of its domestic personal care businesses to its Fine Today Shiseido subsidiary and was sold to CVC after the completion in July 2021.

=== World War II ===
==== Luxury ordinances ====
A major concern in Japan during the Second World War was wasteful consumption of luxury products. This led to the imposition of luxury ordinances against goods explicitly tailored to luxury consumption. Due to these concerns, Shiseido emphasized the health benefits, high quality (leading to a maximizing of efficacy) and patriotic national production of their cosmetic products. Since Shiseido did not want to tarnish their deluxe brand image, their designs and advertisements continued to incorporate highly stylized luxurious motifs. Despite an adherence to these motifs, Shiseido advertisements explicitly emphasized the utilitarian aspects of their products over their luxury, for instance toothpaste was endorsed for keeping teeth and gums healthy (rather than for making them beautifully white).

=== Company magazines ===
The company began publishing company magazines in 1924, with Shiseido Monthly (Shiseido Geppo), which contained product advertisements and advice about cosmetics and fashion. Shiseido Monthly was replaced in 1933, with The Shiseido Graph (Shiseido Gurafu), and then renamed to Hanatsubaki in 1937. Shiseido Monthly and The Shiseido Graph featured photographs by Shinzo Fukuhara, the company's second president and a well-known photographer.

Shiseido's public relations magazines are aimed at “inspiring a life of beauty and culture,” following the company's stated corporate ideal.

== International expansion ==
In 1957, Shiseido began distribution in Taiwan, closely followed by Singapore and Hong Kong. In 1962, Shiseido expanded to Hawaii; in 1965, it established Shiseido Cosmetics America. This was followed by distribution in New Zealand also in 1965. A production factory based in Auckland operated from the mid 1970s to 2009, producing products for Australia, Thailand, Singapore, Malaysia, Indonesia and Hawaii.

European sales began with Italy in 1968 and former USSR countries in 1992 with Russia.

In 1985, Shiseido was the first company to produce sodium hyaluronate (hyaluronic acid/hyaluronan) from non-animal origin sources.

== Finances and operations ==
In the first quarter of 2013, Shiseido made a profit of ¥2.66 billion (US$26.87 million) on sales of ¥162.36bn (US$1.64bn). On 15 July 2013, Shiseido announced it was opening a wholly owned subsidiary in India. On 20 February 2014, Shiseido agreed to sell its Carita and Decléor brands to L’Oréal for €227.5M (US$312.93M). This sale resulted in Shiseido showing profits despite running into losses.

In November 2023, Shiseido cut their profit forecast and suffered a 14% decline in stock price, the largest drop in a single day since October 2008. Shiseido cited dropping demand in the Chinese market due to the release of treated wastewater from the Fukushima Daiichi reactor into the Pacific Ocean, after approval by the IAEA. The politicized domestic reporting of this decision drove Chinese customers to boycott or avoid Japanese cosmetics brands.

In 2023, the World Intellectual Property Organization (WIPO)’s Madrid Yearly Review ranked Shiseido's number of marks applications filled under the Madrid System as 7th in the world, with 103 trademarks applications submitted during 2023.

On 17 November 2026, Shiseido announced an agreement to sell Shiseido Liyuan Cosmetics, its Chinese subsidiary that manufactures and markets the Aupres brand, to a consortium led by IDG Capital. The transaction included the subsidiary's Beijing factory and production equipment; financial terms were not disclosed. Completion was expected by the end of the first quarter of 2027, subject to regulatory approval.

== Subsidiaries ==
This is a partial list of Shiseido's wholly owned brands and subsidiaries, as well as exclusive licensing agreements.

=== Prestige division ===
- BAUM
- BENEFIQUE
- Clé de Peau Beauté
- Dr Dennis Gross
- Drunk Elephant
- EFFECTIM
- Gallinée
- THE GINZA
- INOUI
- IPSA
- Issey Miyake
- NARS
- Narciso Rodriguez
- Serge Lutens
- Shiseido
- Tory Burch
- Ulé
- Zadig&Voltaire

=== Premium division ===
- ANESSA
- AQUA LABEL
- AUPRES
- d program
- ELIXIR
- GRACY
- HAKU
- INTEGRATE
- MAJOLICA MAJORCA
- MAQuillAGE
- PRIOR
- REVITAL
- SIDEKICK
- URARA

=== Inner Beauty division ===
- INRYU
- SHISEIDO BEAUTY WELLNESS

=== Life Quality Beauty division ===
- Perfect Cover

Shiseido announced in August 2021 that it would transfer the business of bareMinerals, BUXOM and Laura Mercier Cosmetics to a company owned by private-equity firm Advent International.

== Acquisitions ==
On January 18, 2017, Shiseido acquired Palo Alto, California-based, digital tech company MATCHCo, a startup described by co-founder and former professional skateboarder, Andy Howell, as "AI for beauty." The MATCHCo technology was rebranded by Shiseido as MADE-2-FIT, a bareMinerals iPhone app which offered "precise skin tone analysis via a set of simple user scans, with the help of a virtual makeup artist with voice guidance." To supplement MatchCo., Shiseido later acquired Giaran Inc., a data driven company, in November 2017.

In January 2018, the company acquired all the assets of Olivo Laboratories.

In December 2023, Shiseido acquired Dr. Dennis Gross Skincare brand which offers dermatologist-led, science-based prestige skincare that has revolutionized the beauty industry by bringing high-level products to consumers everywhere.

== Makeup ==
Shiseido produces a line of cosmetics simply called "The Makeup" that provide a full range of products including: lip products, powder eye shadows, eye liner pencils, mascara, fluid and compact foundations, concealers, and powder blushes. Their hydro powder eye shadows which have a creamy texture are among Allure magazine's top beauty picks.

Shiseido stepped into the world of cosmetics with the introduction of Eudermine in 1897, and established the Cosmetics Division and a store selling cosmetics in 1916. With the birth of new cosmetics, the definition of makeup started to alter in the 1920s. The cosmetics were not used exclusively by women. Men started to use makeup to rebuild their image. Shiseido's scented hair tonics were among their most popular early cosmetics for both men and women, fueled by a reaction to Western distaste for less fragrant traditional hair oil products. Shiseido also began to produce floral perfumes which contributed to the brand's "De Luxe" and "rich” aesthetic.

Meanwhile, modern beauty methods became a popular beauty topic in advertisements, newspaper columns and magazines in the late 1920s to the early 1930s. At that time, cosmetic consumers focused on the selection of the makeup and their uses. The single-makeup method of painting the face white was considered outdated. The beauty consumers liked to apply up to seven different colors of face powder including "white, yellow, flesh, rose, peony, green and purple" to match their skin tone. In order to explore more potential consumers, Shiseido trained beauty advisers, who demonstrated and illustrated the uses of the cosmetics on the on-site demonstration briefing.

== Animal testing ==
In 2017, Shiseido's subsidiary company, NARS Cosmetics, announced it was going to start testing their products on animals. In defense of its decision, the company stated "We have decided to make NARS available in China because we feel it is important to bring our vision of beauty and artistry to fans in the region. Nars does not test on animals or ask others to do so on our behalf, except where required by law".
