= Annelise Michelson =

French jewellery designer and sculptor

- Born: Paris, France
- Occupations: Jewellery designer, sculptor
- Website: annelisemichelson.com

Annelise Michelson is a French jewellery designer and sculptor.

== Biography ==
Michelson was born in Paris to a French father and a South African mother, an opera singer. She studied fashion design and pattern making at the Chambre Syndicale de la Haute Couture in Paris. She subsequently worked in the Paris fashion industry, including at Hermès.

=== Career ===
Michelson founded her jewellery label in Paris in 2012. Her collections include Carnivore, Déchaînée, Drapée, Unity and Wire. In 2015, Michelson was a finalist for the Accessories Prize at the ANDAM Fashion Award.

Michelson has collaborated and worked with Zadig & Voltaire in 2017 during New York Fashion Week, Maison Fred in 2020, Acqua di Parma in 2024, among others.

Michelson has also worked in sculpture, using materials including plaster, marble and stone.
