= Ashlee Simpson =

American singer and actress (born 1984)

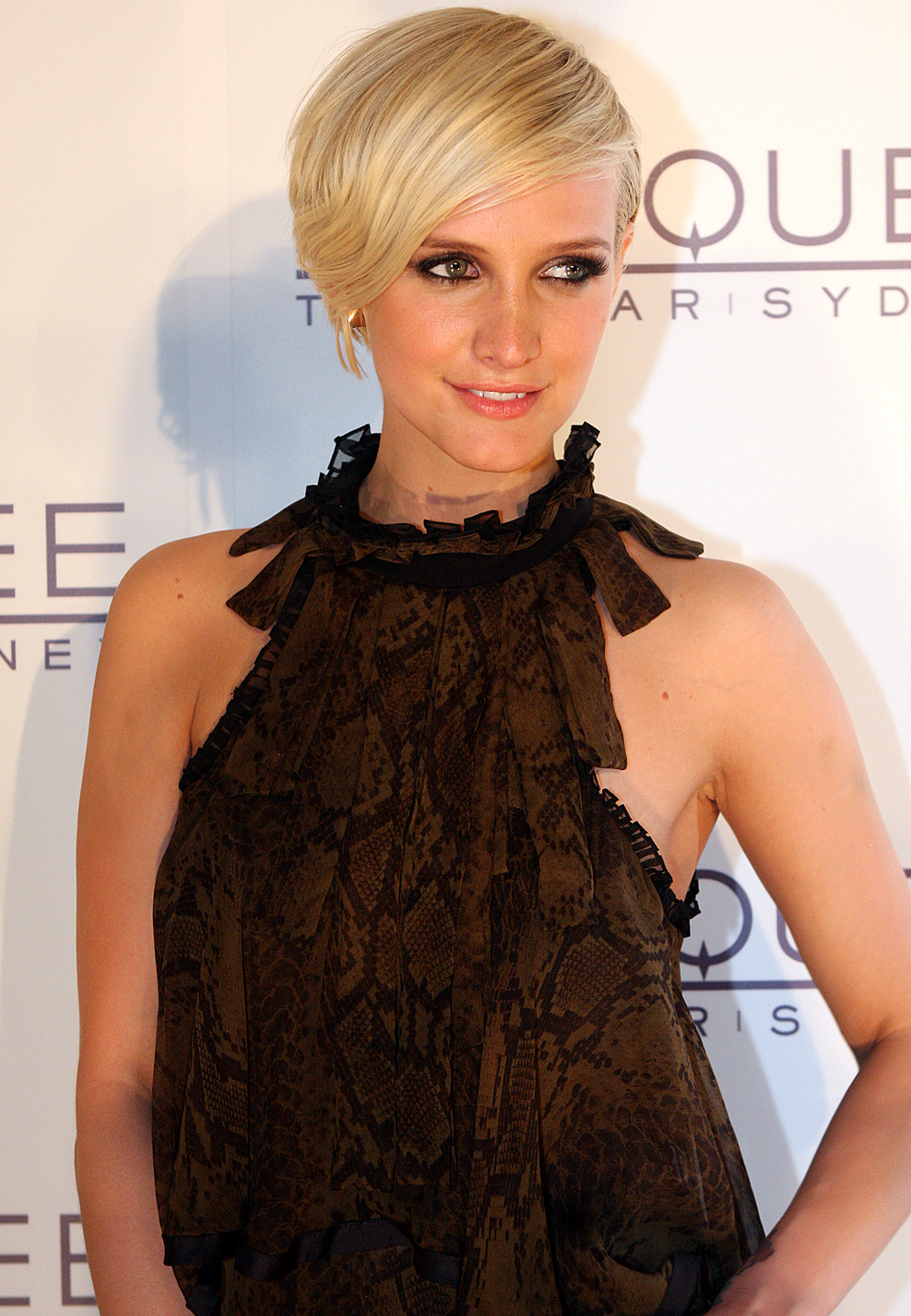
- Simpson in 2012
- Born: Ashley Nicolle Simpson; October 3, 1984 (age 42); Waco, Texas, U.S.
- Other names: Ashlee Simpson-Wentz; Ashlee Simpson Ross
- Occupations: Singer; songwriter; actress; television personality
- Years active: 1999–present
- Spouses: Pete Wentz (m. 2008; div. 2011) Evan Ross (m. 2014)
- Children: 3
- Relatives: Jessica Simpson (sister); Diana Ross (mother-in-law)
- Musical career
- Genres: Pop; pop rock
- Instruments: Vocals
- Labels: Geffen; First Access
- Member of: Ashlee + Evan

Ashley Nicolle Ross-Næss (née Simpson; born October 3, 1984), also known as Ashlee Simpson, is an American singer, songwriter, actress, and television personality. The younger sister of singer and actress Jessica Simpson, Simpson began her career as a backup dancer for her sister and appeared in television commercials at the age of 15. She later pursued acting, landing a main role on the family drama 7th Heaven. She also appeared on the MTV reality series Newlyweds: Nick and Jessica, which aired from 2003 to 2005 and followed Jessica and her then-husband, Nick Lachey. While recording her debut studio album, Simpson starred in her own spin-off reality series, The Ashlee Simpson Show, which aired on MTV from 2004 to 2005 and brought her increased media attention.

Simpson achieved her musical breakthrough with her 2004 debut single, "Pieces of Me", which reached the top five of the US Billboard Hot 100 and topped the Billboard Mainstream Top 40 chart. The success of the single and her reality series helped propel her debut album, Autobiography (2004), to number one on the US Billboard 200. The album sold more than five million copies worldwide, becoming her most commercially successful album. Simpson subsequently had a leading role in the film Undiscovered (2005), which was a critical and commercial failure. Her second studio album, I Am Me (2005), debuted atop the Billboard 200, becoming her second consecutive number-one album, and was certified platinum by the Recording Industry Association of America (RIAA).

Following her appearance as Roxie Hart in the West End production of Chicago, Simpson began working on her third studio album. Departing from the pop-rock sound of her previous releases, Bittersweet World (2008) incorporated dance-pop and 1980s influences and received generally positive reviews. The album reached number four on the Billboard 200 but experienced a significant decline in sales compared with her previous albums. In 2009, Simpson joined the main cast of the Melrose Place revival. Later that year, she made her Broadway debut, reprising her role as Roxie Hart in Chicago.

Simpson later announced plans for a fourth studio album and independently released the single "Bat for a Heart" in 2012, though the planned album was ultimately scrapped as she shifted her focus toward raising her child. In July 2013, she reprised her role as Roxie Hart for a third time in a two-date production of Chicago at the Hollywood Bowl, directed by Brooke Shields. In October 2018, Simpson and her husband, Evan Ross, released their debut extended play (EP) as Ashlee + Evan through Access Records. The release was supported by a select North American tour and their reality television series, Ashlee + Evan. In April 2026, Simpson was named the winner of season 14 of The Masked Singer.

== Life and career ==
=== 1984–2002: Early life and career beginnings ===
Born Ashley Nicolle in Waco, Texas, in 1984, Simpson is the daughter of Tina and Joe Simpson. She has one older sister, Jessica Simpson. She and Jessica both attended Prairie Creek Elementary and North Junior High in Richardson, Texas, where they were raised. At the age of three, Simpson began studying classical ballet. At eleven, she enrolled at the School of American Ballet in New York City, becoming the youngest person ever to be admitted to the school. Although the school's minimum age requirement was twelve, Simpson's father later admitted to lying about her age. During this period, Simpson suffered from an unspecified eating disorder for approximately six months before receiving treatment with the support of her parents. She has said that she also began singing during childhood and dreamed of performing on Broadway, rather than pursuing a career in pop music. The Simpson family relocated to Los Angeles, California, in 1999 as Jessica pursued a singing career. As Jessica's career began to take off, Ashlee started appearing in television commercials, with her father, Joe, serving as her agent.

Following the commercial success of Jessica's debut album Sweet Kisses (1999), Ashlee joined her sister as a backup dancer on tour. Hoping to pursue an acting career, Simpson made a minor guest appearance on an episode of Malcolm in the Middle. The following year, she had a small role in the Rob Schneider teen comedy film The Hot Chick (2002), portraying 'Monique.' She later joined the seventh season of the family drama 7th Heaven as Cecilia Smith, a role she continued to portray during the eighth season. Simpson appeared in a total of forty episodes as Cecilia. That same year, she recorded the song "Christmas Past, Present, and Future" for the holiday album School's Out! Christmas; the track was later re-released on Radio Disney Jingle Jams following Simpson's musical breakthrough. She subsequently recorded "Just Let Me Cry" for the soundtrack to the film Freaky Friday (2003). Simpson then began writing and recording demos in hopes of securing a record deal. One month after the release of the Freaky Friday soundtrack, it was confirmed that she had signed with Geffen Records to release her debut studio album.

=== 2003–2004: Breakthrough, Autobiography and Saturday Night Live incident ===
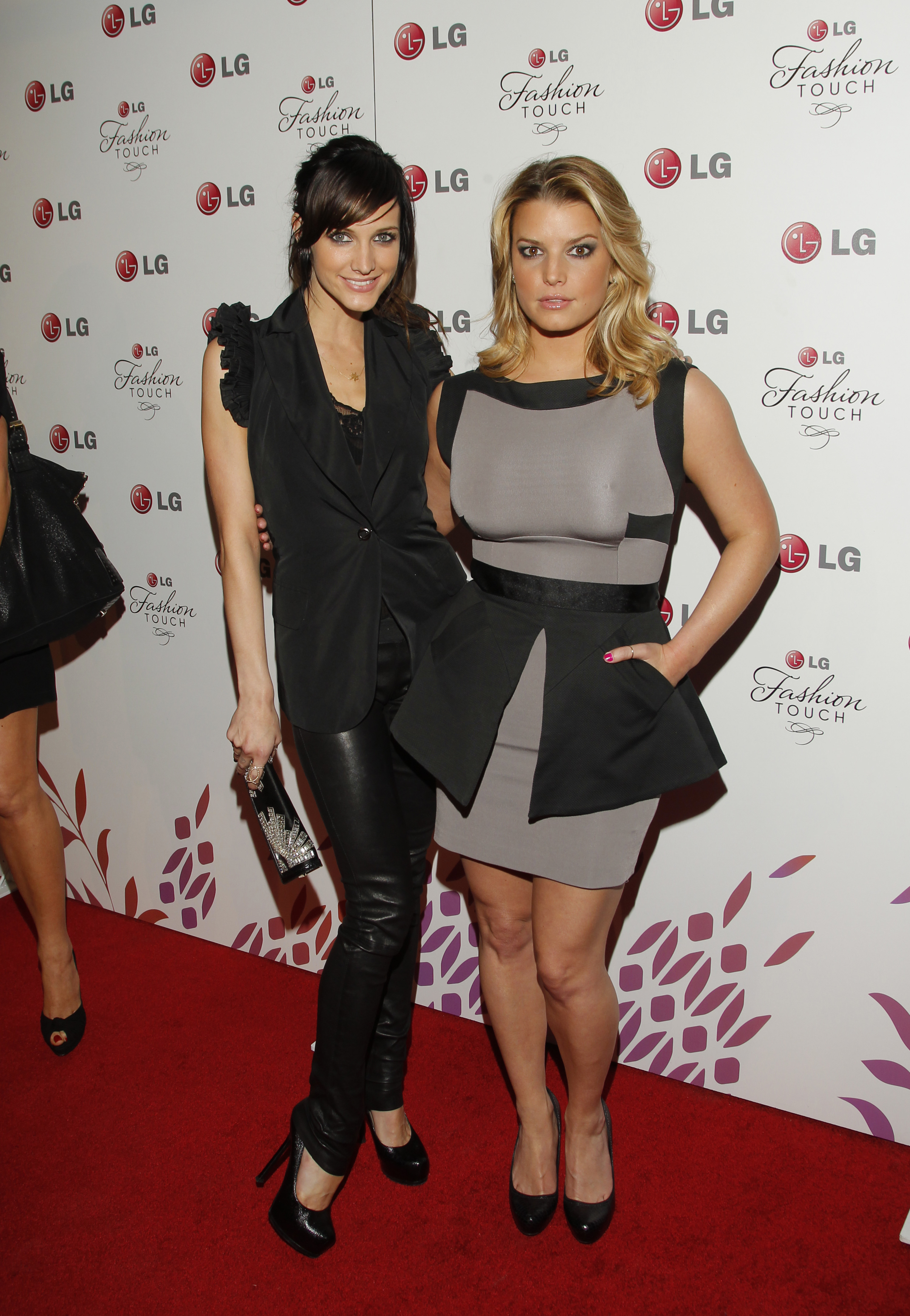
Sisters Ashlee (left) and Jessica (right) were often pitted against one another in the media.

It was announced that Jessica Simpson and her then-husband, Nick Lachey, would star in their own MTV reality series, Newlyweds: Nick and Jessica. The series, which chronicled Simpson and Lachey's lives as a married couple, became a pop culture phenomenon and helped draw greater attention to the Simpson sisters. During the summer of 2003, Ashlee worked as a VJ on MTV's TRL.[2] Following the success of Newlyweds, it was confirmed that Simpson would star in her own reality series, The Ashlee Simpson Show. Hoping to distinguish herself from her sister and reduce comparisons between them, Ashlee wanted the series to focus on the recording of her debut album. During this period, Simpson also dyed her naturally blonde hair brown, a change that received considerable media attention.

Simpson wanted her debut album to feature pop-rock music, as she did not consider herself a listener of mainstream pop. The project was produced by John Shanks, with Simpson co-writing every song on the album. She also collaborated extensively with songwriter Kara DioGuardi, who received writing credits on seven of the album's tracks.The album's lead single, "Pieces of Me", became a commercial success in the United States, reaching the top five of the Billboard Hot 100 and topping the Mainstream Top 40 chart. The single was certified gold by the Recording Industry Association of America (RIAA), denoting sales of 500,000 copies. Her debut album, Autobiography, was released on July 20, 2004, to generally mixed reviews from critics. The album debuted at number one on the Billboard 200 in the United States, selling an estimated 398,000 copies in its first week. It was the best-selling debut album by a female artist that year and had sold more than 2.5 million copies in the United States by January 2005. The album's commercial success, along with that of its lead single, was widely attributed in part to the exposure Simpson received from her reality television series. Autobiography ultimately sold more than five million copies worldwide.

On October 23, 2004, Simpson appeared as the musical guest on an episode of Saturday Night Live to promote Autobiography. After suffering from what she described as vocal cord inflammation caused by acid reflux, Simpson said she had nearly lost her voice and decided to use a pre-recorded vocal track as support during her performances. Her performance of "Pieces of Me" proceeded without incident; however, as she prepared to perform "Autobiography", the vocal track from "Pieces of Me" was mistakenly played. Simpson briefly performed a jig before leaving the stage, later apologizing during the closing credits and attributing the incident to her band playing the wrong song. The incident generated widespread media attention and criticism over Simpson's use of pre-recorded vocals. Days later, Simpson called music video series Total Request Live and said that she had almost completely lost her voice. A 60 Minutes segment filmed behind the scenes that night and broadcast the following week showed Simpson struggling with her voice during rehearsals and eventually leaving the studio in tears. SNL producer Lorne Michaels later stated that he had been unaware of the plan to use pre-recorded vocals and would not have permitted it had he known. Reflecting on the incident, Simpson said, "I made a complete fool of myself."

Despite the negative media attention surrounding the incident, Simpson continued promoting Autobiography. "Shadow" was released as the album's second single in the United States, though it was not released as a single in European territories. While it failed to match the commercial success of its predecessor, it reached the top twenty of the Mainstream Top 40 chart, becoming Simpson's second hit on the chart. Lyrically, the song addressed Simpson's feelings about growing up in the shadow of her older sister's success and received a positive critical reception, with some critics identifying it as a highlight of the album. "La La" was released as the album's third and final single in January 2005 and similarly failed to match the success of "Pieces of Me." Despite peaking relatively low on the Hot 100, the song was certified gold by the RIAA and served as the album's second single in European territories. At the Teen Choice Awards on August 8, 2004, Simpson received the Choice Music: Song of the Summer award for "Pieces of Me", as well as the Fresh Face award. She also received the Billboard Music Award for New Female Artist of the Year in December, and that same month, Entertainment Weekly named her one of its Breakout Stars of 2004.

=== 2005–2007: I Am Me, touring and Broadway ===
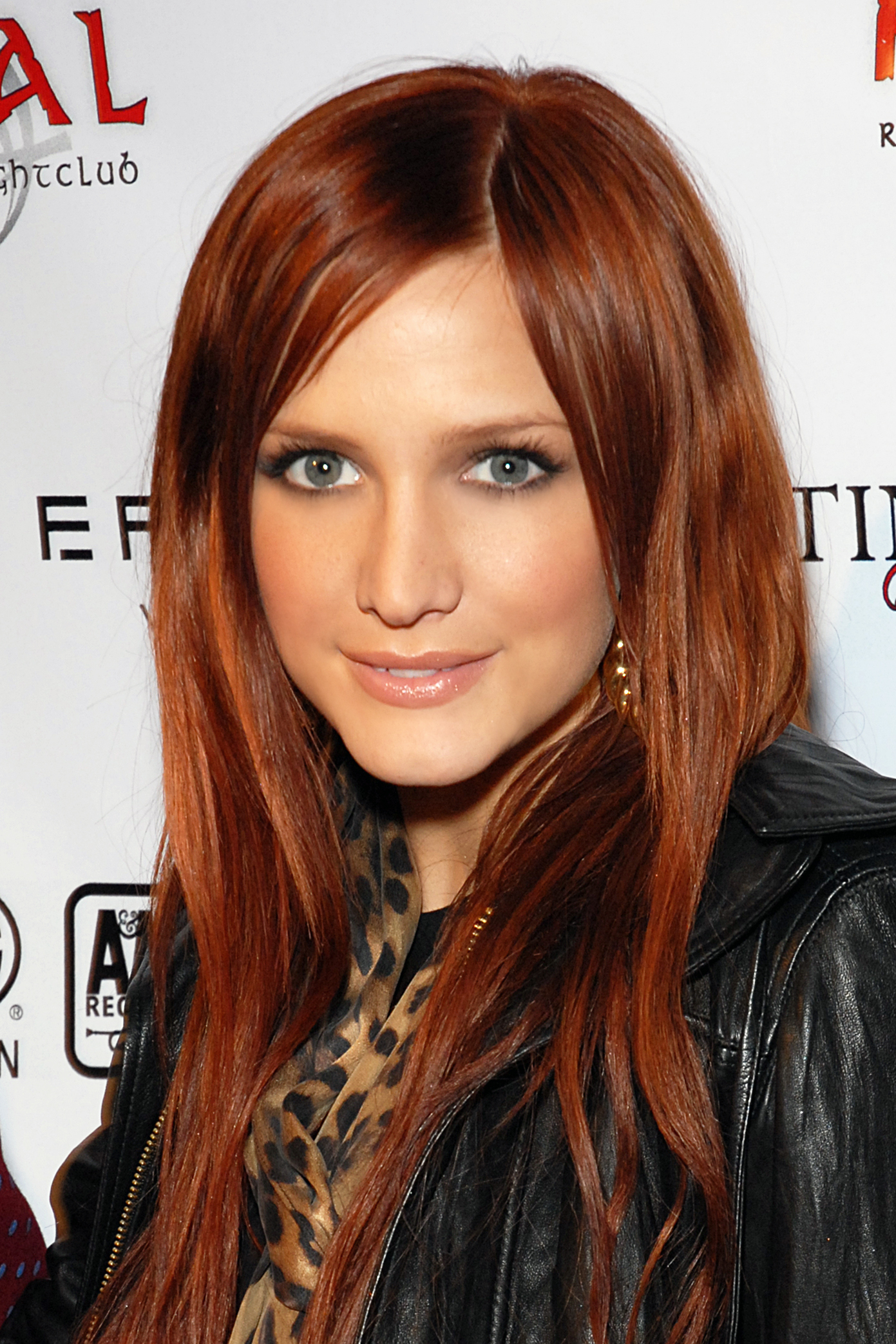
Simpson at a Grammy party in 2008

Simpson performed as a musical guest during halftime at the 2005 Orange Bowl in Miami, Florida, where her performance of "La La" received a negative response from the crowd, including boos.In February 2005, she embarked on the Autobiography Tour across North America. While touring, Simpson began writing material for her second studio album. She also had a supporting role in the film Undiscovered, portraying aspiring actress Clea. The film was a critical and commercial failure, and Simpson received a nomination for Worst Supporting Actress at the 2005 Golden Raspberry Awards.

Simpson released her second studio album, I Am Me, in October 2005. The album continued the pop-rock sound of her debut while incorporating influences from 1980s music, and Simpson again co-wrote every track. I Am Me became her second consecutive album to debut at number one on the Billboard 200, selling 220,000 copies in its first week in the United States. Although it did not match the commercial success of Autobiography, the album went on to sell more than three million copies worldwide. Its lead single, "Boyfriend", was inspired by rumors surrounding Simpson and Wilmer Valderrama and became her second top-twenty hit in the United States. The second and final single, "L.O.V.E.", reached the top forty. Simpson later returned to Saturday Night Live, performing "Catch Me When I Fall", which was inspired by her previous appearance on the program, and "Boyfriend" without incident. In December 2005, Simpson collapsed following a performance in Japan and was briefly hospitalized for exhaustion, resulting in the cancellation of a scheduled appearance at the Radio Music Awards. Simpson embarked on her I Am Me Tour in late 2005. On April 12, 2006, she hosted and performed at the MTV Australia Video Music Awards, where she won Best Female Artist and Best Pop Video for "Boyfriend."

Simpson embarked on her third North American tour, the L.O.V.E. Tour, in support of I Am Me. In June 2006, she released "Invisible", a cover of a song by Jaded Era, which had originally been intended for a planned re-release of I Am Me that was later scrapped. The single peaked at number 21 on the Billboard Hot 100 and became Simpson's second single to reach the top ten of the Mainstream Top 40 chart. Later that year, Simpson was cast as Roxie Hart in the West End production of Chicago, performing in the role from September 25 to October 28, 2006. Her performance received generally positive reviews, including one that described it as "dazzling and near flawless."

=== 2007–2015: Bittersweet World and return to Broadway ===
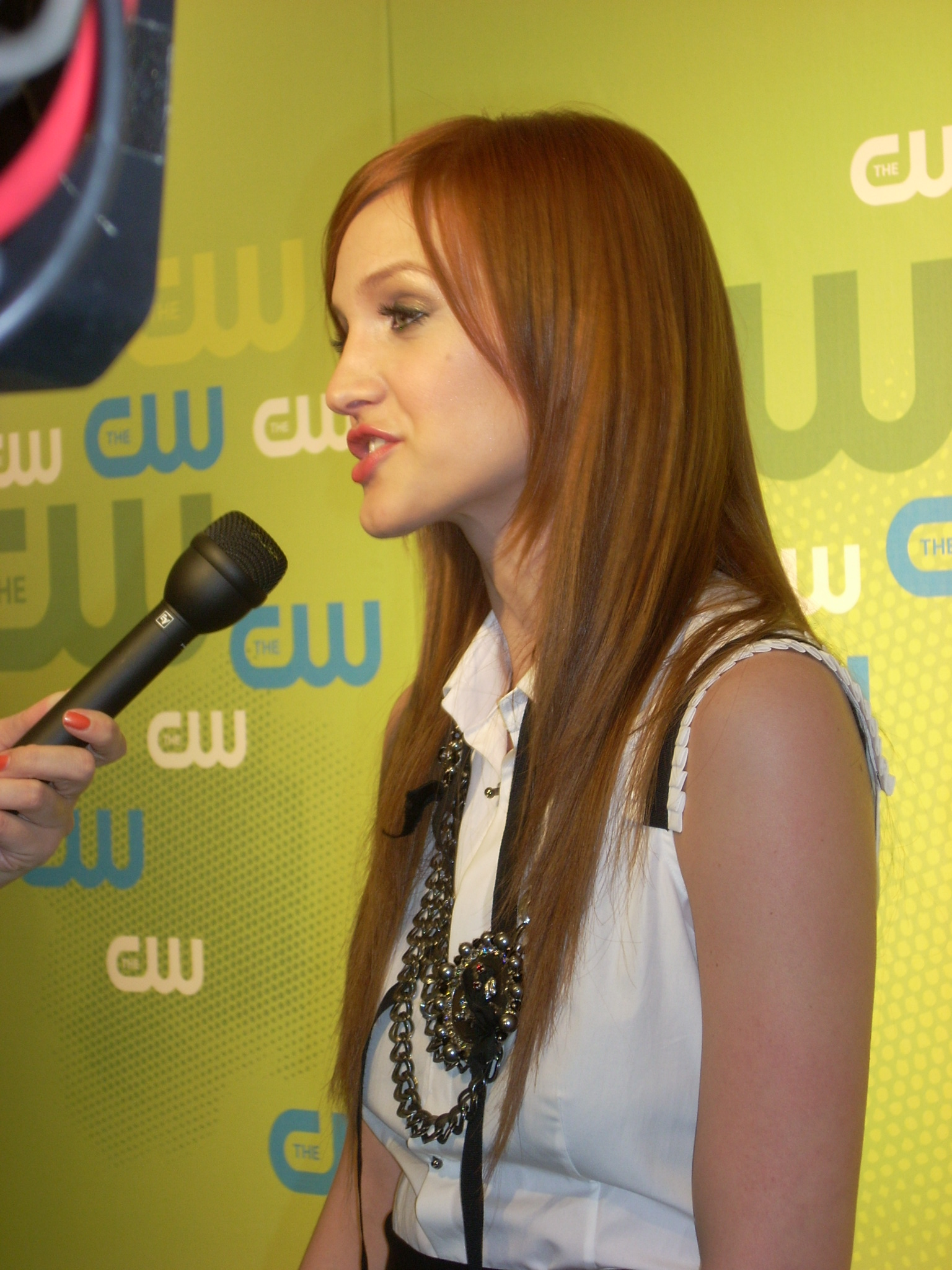
Simpson in 2009

Following her appearance as Roxie Hart, Simpson began working on her third studio album, which was initially slated for release in late 2007. In December 2006, Geffen Records chairman Ron Fair acknowledged that media scrutiny surrounding Simpson presented challenges for the project but expressed the label's continued support for her. Seeking to transition to a new sound, Simpson enlisted producers including Timbaland and The Neptunes to incorporate more beat-oriented material. The album's lead single, "Outta My Head (Ay Ya Ya)", was released in December 2007 and incorporated synth-pop and 1980s influences. Although the single failed to chart on the Billboard Hot 100, it achieved moderate success internationally. In February 2008, Simpson released "Little Miss Obsessive" as the album's second single; it peaked at number 96 on the Billboard Hot 100. Simpson's third studio album, Bittersweet World, was released in April 2008 and debuted at number four on the Billboard 200, selling 47,000 copies in its first week. That same month, Simpson launched a collection of tops in partnership with clothing retailer Wet Seal. The album sold 126,000 copies in the United States during its first year, becoming her lowest-selling album and marked her final album released through Geffen Records. Promotion of the album ended following Simpson's pregnancy announcement later that year.

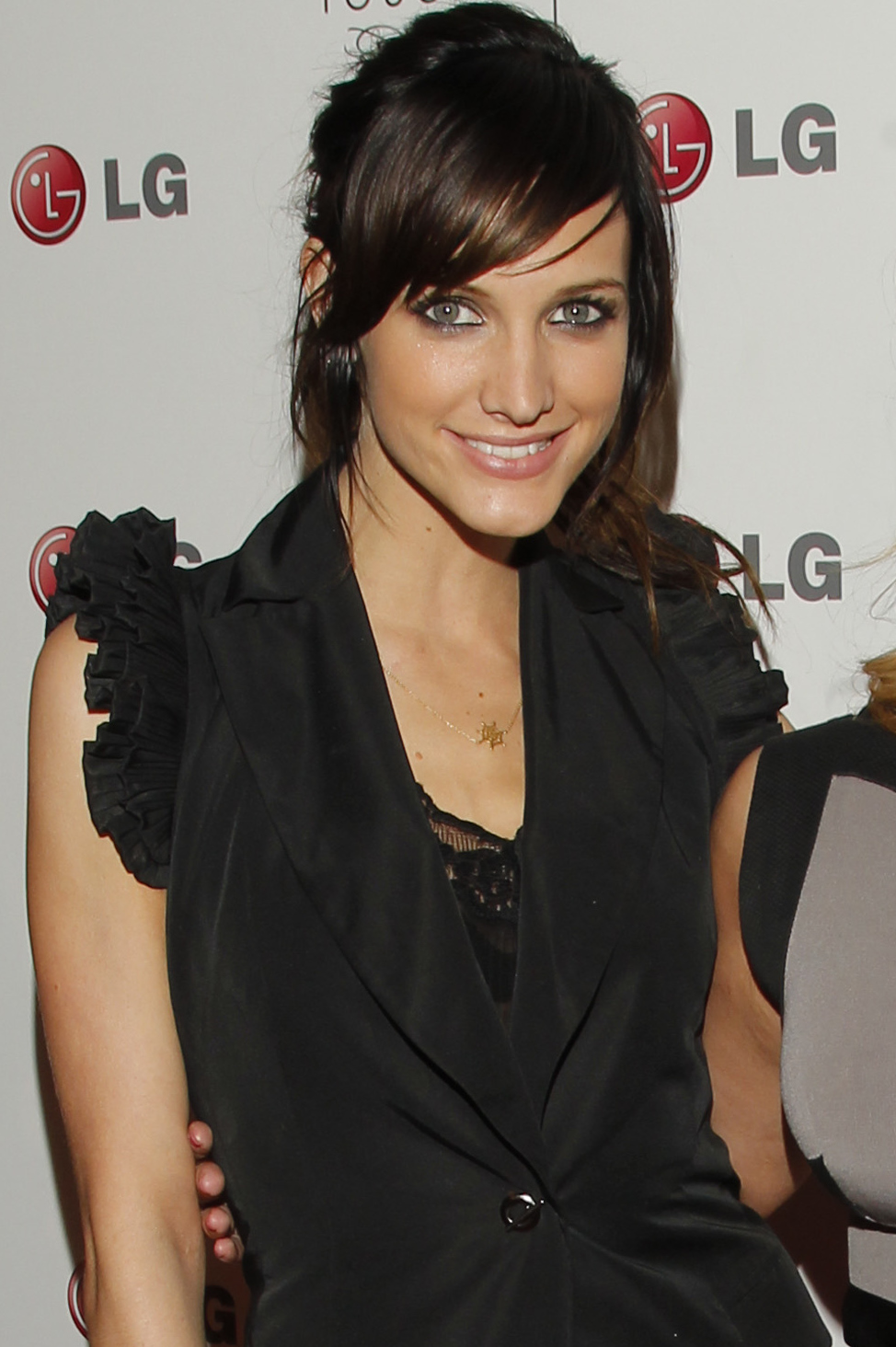
Simpson in 2010

In 2009, Simpson returned to television as Violet Foster in Melrose Place, The CW's revival of the 1990s series of the same name. Initially cast as a series regular, Simpson departed after twelve episodes when her character was written out following the conclusion of a murder-mystery storyline. Following her departure, she reprised her role as Roxie Hart in the Broadway production of Chicago, performing from November 2009 to February 2010. SIn 2011, Simpson appeared as a guest judge on America's Next Top Model, Cycle 17. That year, she also collaborated with her sister's fashion brand to create a clothing line for girls, serving as its co-creative director.

In 2011, Simpson confirmed that she had begun working on her fourth studio album, which she initially described as having a "folk feel." The project later shifted toward a more electronic sound. In 2012, she independently released "Bat for a Heart", written by Linda Perry, as her first single in several years. The song received mixed reviews and failed to achieve commercial success. The planned album ultimately went unreleased, and "Bat for a Heart" became Simpson's final musical release for several years.

In 2012, Simpson filmed a role in the comedy Pawn Shop Chronicles, which was released in 2013. That year, she portrayed Roxie Hart for a third time in Chicago, appearing in the show's Hollywood Bowl production. Her performance received mixed reviews, although she was described as an "audience favorite."

In July 2013, Simpson reprised Roxie Hart in Chicago at the Hollywood Bowl, marking her third professional engagement in the role after the West End and Broadway. The production ran July 26–28 and was directed by Brooke Shields.

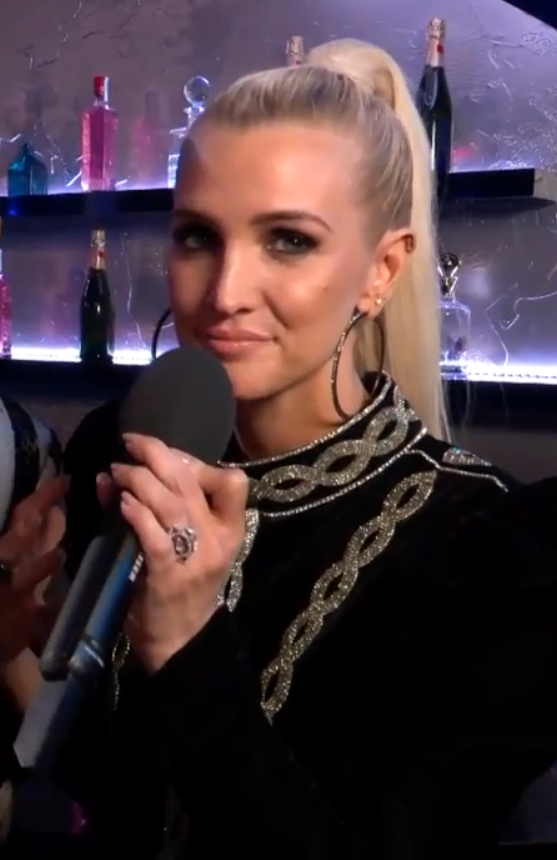
Simpson in 2018

=== 2016-present: Return to music, Ashlee+Evan and the Masked Singer ===
In May 2016, Simpson said she had stepped away from a possible return to acting to focus on new music, revealing that she had written approximately ten songs with her husband, Evan Ross. In 2018, Simpson and Ross collaborated with French fashion brand Zadig & Voltaire on a unisex clothing collection titled "Jagger Snow." That year, Simpson also voiced Strelka in the animated film Space Dogs Adventure to the Moon, alongside Alicia Silverstone. Simpson and Ross subsequently starred in the E! reality series Ashlee+Evan, which premiered in September 2018. The couple released their debut duet single, "I Do," that same month, followed by the extended play Ashlee + Evan later that year.

Simpson returned to acting as Kate in the Christmas film The Recipe Files, which premiered on QVC+ in November 2023. In June 2025, she announced I Am Me, a Labor Day weekend residency at Voltaire at the Venetian Resort in Las Vegas, named after her 2005 album of the same name.

In 2026, Simpson competed as "Galaxy Girl" on season fourteen of The Masked Singer and ultimately won the season. Her sister Jessica appeared as part of the final clue and unmasking, while Ross was revealed to have also competed during the season as "Stingray." Following her victory, Simpson performed an encore of "Pieces of Me."

== Personal life ==
While filming Newleyweds, Simpson appeared in the music video for musician Ryan Cabrera's debut single "On the Way Down" (2004), portraying herself as Cabrera's love interest. The couple later began a romantic relationship, with Cabrera inspiring multiple songs for Simpson's album. Simpson and Cabrera ended their relationship, though the two remained friends. In January 2005, media outlets speculated that Simpson was romantically involved with actor Wilmer Valderrama, resulting in reports of a love triangle involving his former girlfriend Lindsay Lohan. Simpson's representatives denied the reports, stating that she and Valderrama were longtime friends and were not romantically involved. Later that year, Simpson began dating her drummer, Braxton Olita.

In April 2006, Simpson underwent rhinoplasty. In a 2007 interview with Harper's Bazaar, she described plastic surgery as a personal choice and denied that her decision stemmed from insecurity about her appearance. Her father, Joe Simpson, later stated that the procedure had also corrected a breathing problem.

Following her split from Olita, Simpson began a relationship with Fall Out Boy bassist Pete Wentz. The couple announced their engagement in April 2008 and married on May 17, 2008, at Simpson's parents' home in Encino, California, with her father officiating the ceremony. Simpson adopted Wentz's surname and was professionally known as Ashlee Simpson-Wentz during their marriage. Two weeks after their wedding, the couple announced that Simpson was pregnant, and she gave birth to their son on November 20, 2008. Simpson filed for divorce from Wentz on February 9, 2011, citing irreconcilable differences and requesting the restoration of her maiden name. Their divorce was finalized on November 22, 2011.

Following her separation from Wentz, Simpson began a relationship with actor Vincent Piazza, which ended after approximately a year and a half. In July 2013, Simpson began dating actor Evan Ross, son of singer Diana Ross. Simpson and Ross became engaged in January 2014, and married on August 30, 2014, at Diana Ross's estate in Connecticut. Simpson gave birth to their daughter on July 30, 2015. That month, Simpson and Ross filed requests to change their surname to Ross-Næss; Næss was Ross's original legal surname through his father, businessman Arne Næss Jr., while Ross was his mother's surname. In April 2020, Simpson announced that she was expecting their second child together, her third overall. She gave birth to their son on October 29, 2020.

== Public image ==
Following the release of Autobiography, Simpson was marketed as an "anti-Britney" and drew comparisons to pop-rock artists such as Avril Lavigne and Fefe Dobson. The media frequently highlighted her punk-influenced image and style, which were presented as a contrast to those of her older sister, Jessica. The popularity of Jessica's reality series Newlyweds: Nick and Jessica, along with Ashlee's subsequent music and television career, brought considerable media attention to both sisters.

Simpson's public image was significantly affected by her controversial 2004 appearance on Saturday Night Live, when a technical error exposed her use of pre-recorded vocals. The incident received widespread media coverage and criticism and became closely associated with her public image.

In 2006, Simpson's appearance in Marie Claire generated controversy after she criticized Hollywood's standards of female beauty and participated in a pro-female mural project with a group of girls in Los Angeles. By the time the issue was published, Simpson had undergone rhinoplasty, leading some readers to accuse her of hypocrisy. The magazine subsequently received more than 1,000 letters of complaint.

Simpson has appeared on the covers of numerous magazines, including Women's Health, Jane, Shape, Allure, Marie Claire, Seventeen and international editions of Cosmopolitan. She has also appeared in advertising campaigns for brands including Zellers, Pizza Hut and Skechers.Forbes included Simpson among its "Richest Young Celebrities", reporting earnings of $8.3 million in 2005, and later included Simpson and then-husband Pete Wentz on its list of high-earning celebrity couples.

== Musical style ==
Vocally, Simpson is an alto with a two-octave vocal range. She has worked with a vocal coach and cited Etta James and Aretha Franklin as vocal inspirations. Her musical influences include Guns N' Roses, Gwen Stefani and No Doubt, Joan Jett and The Runaways, Madonna, Pat Benatar, Green Day, Alanis Morissette, Fiona Apple, Chrissie Hynde, and Debbie Harry.

== Filmography ==
=== Film ===
Year	Title	Role	Notes
2002	The Hot Chick	Monique	
2005	Undiscovered	Clea	
2013	Pawn Shop Chronicles	Theresa	
2016	Space Dogs Adventure to the Moon	Strelka	Voice
2023	The Recipe Files	Kate	QVC+ original film

=== Television ===
Year	Title	Role	Notes
2001	Malcolm in the Middle	Malcolm's classmate	Episode: "Reese Cooks"
2002–2004	7th Heaven	Cecilia Smith	Main role (Seasons 7–8); 40 episodes
2003–2005	Newlyweds: Nick and Jessica	Herself	Reality show
2004–2005	The Ashlee Simpson Show	Herself	Reality show
2008	Dog Whisperer	Herself	Episode: "Cricket and Hemingway & Rigby"
2009	CSI: NY	Lila Wickfield	Episode: "Point of No Return"
2009–2010	Melrose Place	Violet Foster	Main role; 13 episodes
2011	America's Next Top Model	Herself / Guest judge	Episode: "Ashlee Simpson"
2018	Ashlee + Evan	Herself	Also as executive producer
2020	The Bachelor Presents: Listen to Your Heart	Herself / Guest judge	Episode: "Week 5"
2024	Celebrity Family Food Battle	Herself / Contestant	Episode: "Chudney and the Chocolate Factory"
2026	Is It Cake? Valentines	Herself / Guest judge	Special episode
2026	The Masked Singer	Herself / Galaxy Girl	Winner (season 14)

== Stage ==
Year	Title	Role	Notes
2006	Chicago	Roxie Hart	West End
2009	Chicago	Roxie Hart	Broadway
2013	Chicago	Roxie Hart	Hollywood Bowl

== Tours and residencies ==
=== Headlining tours ===
- Autobiography Tour (2004)
- L.O.V.E. Tour (2005–2006)
- Club Tour (2008)

=== Residencies ===
- Ashlee Simpson: I Am Me (2025–2026)

== Discography ==
- Autobiography (2004)
- I Am Me (2005)
- Bittersweet World (2008)

== Awards and nominations ==
- List of awards and nominations received by Ashlee Simpson
