= List of awards and nominations received by Ashlee Simpson =

Ashlee Simpson awards and nominations
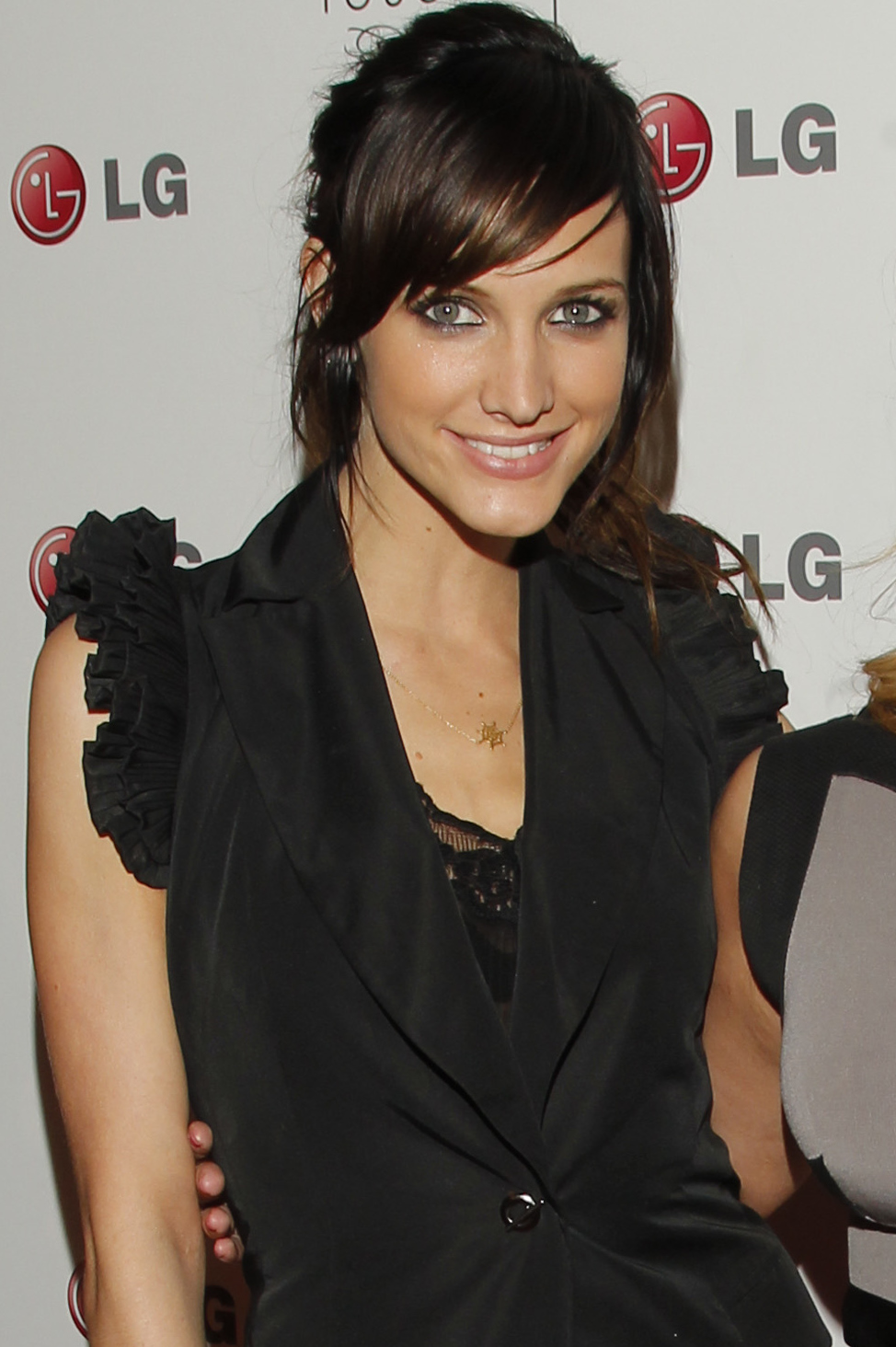
- Ashlee Simpson in May 2010.
Awards and nominations
Award	Wins	Nominations
MTV Asia	1	2
MTV Australia	2	3
MTV VMA	0	2
Teen Choice	2	4
World Music Awards	0	2
Golden Raspberry Awards	0	2
MTV Video Music Awards Japan	0	1
Los Premios MTV Latinoamérica	0	3
Billboard Music Awards	1	1
ASCAP Awards	1	1
BMI Awards	1	1
Bravo Supershow Awards	1	1
TRL Awards	1	1
Japan Gold Disc Award	1	1

Totals (Note: Certain award groups do not simply award one winner. They acknowledge several different recipients, have runners-up, and have third place. Since this is a specific recognition and is different from losing an award, runner-up mentions are considered wins in this award tally. For simplification and to avoid errors, each award in this list has been presumed to have had a prior nomination.)
- Wins: 14
- Nominations: 32

Ashlee Simpson is an American singer-songwriter, dancer and actress. She is signed with Geffen Records and as of April 2008, has released 3 studio albums Autobiography, I Am Me, and Bittersweet World.

In 2004 Autobiography was certified 3× Platinum by the RIAA and was one of the best selling albums of that year making Simpson rose to prominence and be nominated on several music awards. Simpson's first ever nomination was for her work in 7th Heaven, where she played Cecilia Smith, a supporting role. Simpson's also ranked in Billboard Decade End Chart (2000–2010) with Autobiography in the # 149 place and as Billboard 200 Artists in the # 145 place. Also Simpson made the ARIA Decade End Chart selling more than 300,000 singles and ranking in the top 350.

Her Outta My Head (Ay Ya Ya) music video won Best Art Direction at the 2008’s MVPA Awards. The award recipient was the production designer Evan Rohde.

== ASCAP Awards ==
The American Society of Composers, Authors and Publishers (ASCAP) is a not-for-profit performance rights organization that protects its members' musical copyrights by monitoring public performances of their music, whether via a broadcast or live performance, and compensating them accordingly. Simpson has received one award.

Year	Nominee / work	Award	Result
2005	Pieces of Me	ASCAP Award Most Performed Songs	Won

== Billboard Music Awards ==
Billboard Music Awards winners in many categories have been announced by Billboard both in the press and as part of their year-end issue. Simpson was recognized during a live televised show in 2004.

Year	Nominee / work	Award	Result
2004	Herself	Best New Female Artist of the Year	Won

== BMI Awards ==
The Broadcast Music, Incorporated (BMI) Awards is an annual award show hosted for the purpose of giving awards to songwriters. Songwriters are selected each year from the entire BMI catalog, based on the number of performances during the award period. At the 53rd annual BMI awards, "Pieces of Me", a song co-written by Ashlee Simpson, John Shanks and Kara DioGuardi, took home the honor, "BMI Award Winning Song".

Year	Nominee / work	Award	Result
2006	"Pieces of Me"	Winning Song	Won

== Bravo Super Show Awards ==
Year	Nominee / work	Award	Result
2008	Outta My Head (Ay Ya Ya)	Best Song	Won

== Golden Raspberry Awards ==
A Golden Raspberry Award, or Razzie for short, is an award presented in recognition of the worst in movies. Founded in 1981. Ashlee was nominated twice on the same year but lost to Paris Hilton.

Year	Nominee / work	Award	Result
2006	Herself (Undiscovered)	Worst Supporting Actress	Nominated
2006	Herself (with Jessica Simpson and Nick Lachey)	Most Tiresome Tabloid Targets	Nominated

== Groovevolt Music and Fashion Awards ==
Year	Nominee / work	Award	Result
2005	Pieces of Me	Best Song Performance - Female	Nominated

== Japan Gold Disc Awards ==
The Japan Gold Disc Awards are an annual ceremony hosted in Japan. The winner are based by sales provided by The Recording Industry Association of Japan (RIAJ).

Year	Nominee / work	Award	Result
2005	Herself	Japan Gold Disc Award for Best New Artist	Won

== MTV Awards ==
=== MTV Asia Awards ===
The MTV Asia Awards were established in 2002 by MTV Networks Asia to celebrate the most popular music videos in Asia. Simpson has been nominated twice, winning one.

Year	Nominee / work	Award	Result
2005	Herself	Favorite Breakthrough Artist	Won
2006	Herself	Favorite Female Artist	Nominated

=== MTV Video Music Awards ===
The MTV Video Music Awards is an annual awards ceremony established in 1984 by MTV. Ashlee Simpson has received two nominations.

Year	Nominee / work	Award	Result
2005	Pieces of Me	Best Pop Video	Nominated
2006	Invisible	Best Cinematography	Nominated

=== MTV Australia Awards ===
The MTV Australia Awards is a music video awards show presented annually on MTV. Simpson has been nominated three times.

Year	Nominee / work	Award	Result
2005	Pieces of Me	Best Pop Artist – International	Nominated
2006	Boyfriend	Best Female Artist	Won
2006	Boyfriend	Best Pop Video	Won

=== Los Premios MTV Latinoamérica ===
Los Premios MTV Latinoamérica is the Latin American version of the MTV Video Music Awards. Simpson has received three nominations.

Year	Nominee / work	Award	Result
2005	Ashlee Simpson	Best New Artist – International	Nominated
2005	Ashlee Simpson	Best Pop Artist – International	Nominated
2006	Ashlee Simpson	Best Pop Artist – International	Nominated

=== MTV Video Music Awards Japan ===
Year	Nominee / work	Award	Result
2005	"Pieces of Me"	Best New Artist	Nominated

== Spin Awards ==
Year	Nominee / work	Award	Result
2005	Herself	Worst Dressed	Runner-up
2005	Herself	Worst Live Act	Won
2005	Herself	Worst Solo Artist	Won

== Stinkers Bad Movie Awards ==
Year	Nominee / work	Award	Result
2006	Smart in a Stupid Way	Worst Song or Song Performance in a Film or Its End Credits	Nominated
2006	Undiscovered	Worst Song or Song Performance in a Film or Its End Credits	Nominated

== Teen Choice Awards ==
The Teen Choice Awards is an annual fan voted awards show established in 1999 by the Fox Broadcasting Company. Ashlee Simpson has received four nominations, which she has won 2 awards.

Year	Nominee / work	Award	Result
2003	Herself	Choice TV Breakout Star – Female: 7th Heaven	Nominated
2004	Herself	Choice Fresh Face	Won
2004	Pieces of Me	Choice Song of the Summer	Won
2005	Herself	Choice TV Personality: Female	Nominated

== TRL Awards ==
Simpson received during an episode of Total Request Live on MTV channel this award representing how she did a strong comeback with her sophomore number one album I Am Me

Year	Nominee / work	Award	Result
2006	Herself	TRL Award for Bounce Back Artist	Won

== Virgin Media Music Awards ==
Year	Nominee / work	Award	Result
2008	Outta My Head (Ay Ya Ya)	Worst Track	Won

== World Music Awards ==
The World Music Awards is an international awards show. It was established in 1989 that annually honors recording artists based on worldwide sales figures provided by the International Federation of the Phonographic Industry (IFPI). Simpson has received two nominations.

Year	Nominee / work	Award	Result
2005	Herself	World's Best Selling Pop/Rock Artist	Nominated
2005	Herself	World's Best Selling New Female Artist	Nominated
