= NARS Cosmetics =

Skin care company

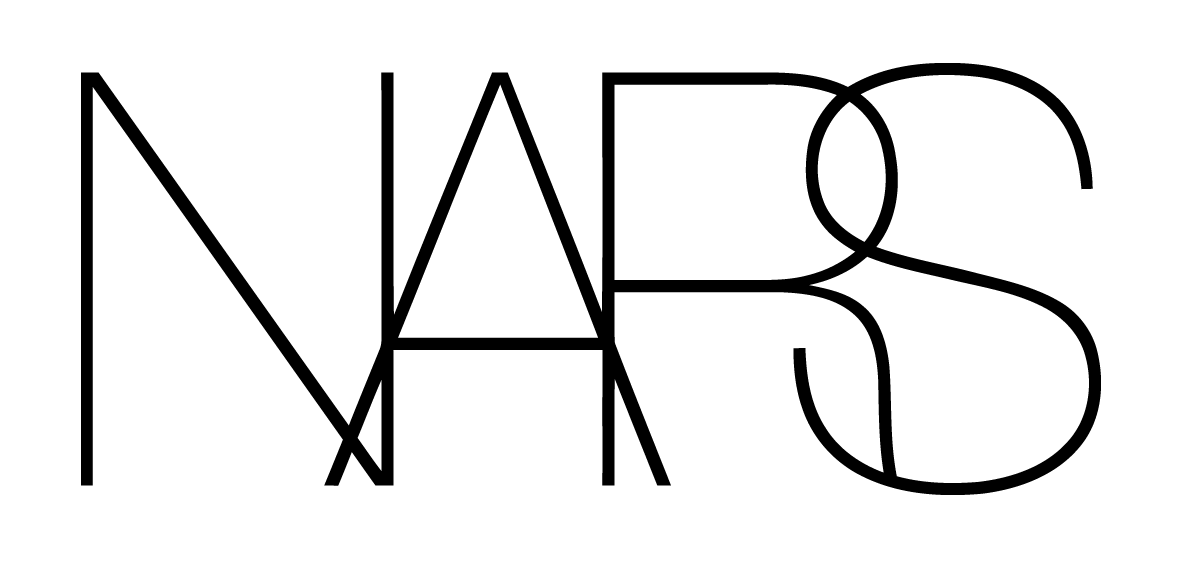
- Type: Subsidiary
- Industry: Personal care
- Founded: 1994; 32 years ago
- Founder: François Nars
- Key people: Barbara Calcagni (President)
- Products: Cosmetics and skin care
- Parent: Shiseido
- Website: narscosmetics.com

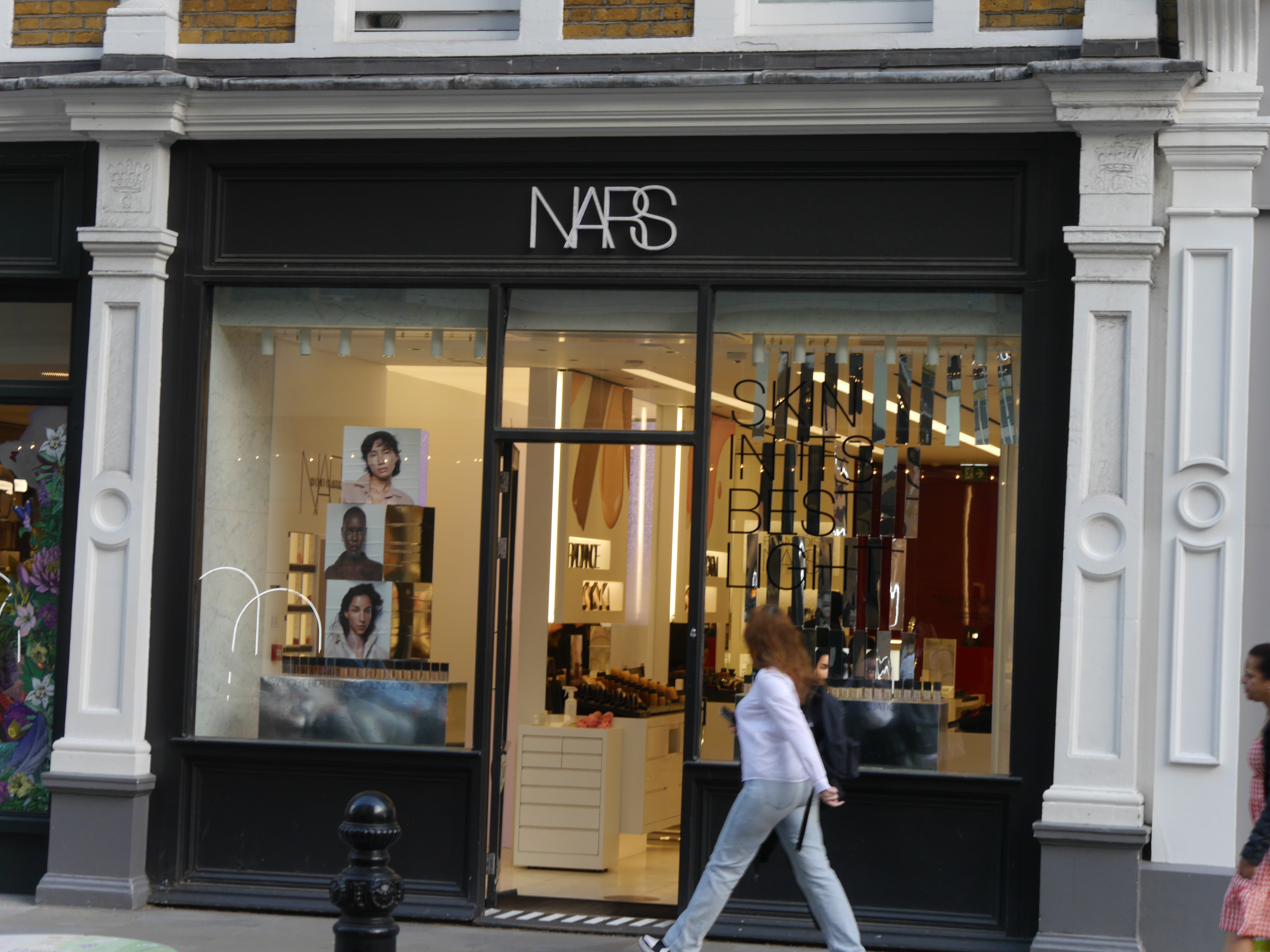
NARS store, King's Road, London, 2022

NARS Cosmetics is a French cosmetics and skin care company founded by make-up artist and photographer François Nars in 1994. The cosmetics line began with twelve lipsticks sold at Barneys New York. Since then, NARS has created various multi-use beauty products and is now a subsidiary of Shiseido. NARS primarily sells its products in department stores across approximately 30 countries, including those in the Americas, Europe, and Southeast Asia, as well as Japan.

== Founder ==
NARS Cosmetics was founded by French makeup artist François Nars in 1994. After graduating from Carita Makeup school in Paris, Nars moved to New York in 1984. In the eighties and nineties, they produced magazine editorials in American Vogue, Vogue Italia, and Elle.

The company was sold to Shiseido, a Tokyo-based company, in 2000. In 2023, NARS was launched in India.

== Controversy ==
=== Animal testing ===
NARS is no longer a cruelty-free brand. In 2017, NARS announced that, despite its opposition to animal testing, it was required to conduct animal testing to sell products in the Chinese market. In a public statement, the company said: "We have decided to make NARS available in China because we feel it is important to bring our vision of beauty and artistry to fans in the region. NARS does not test on animals or ask others to do so on our behalf, except where required by law." The statement elicited a number of critical responses, including calls for a boycott of its products.
