= Drunk Elephant =

Houston-based skincare brand

- Type: Subsidiary
- Industry: Skincare / Cosmetics
- Founded: 2012
- Founder: Tiffany Masterson
- Headquarters: Houston, Texas, United States
- Area served: International
- Key people: Tiffany Masterson (Founder, Chief Creative Officer & President)
- Products: Skincare, haircare, body care
- Revenue: $120 million (2019)
- Owner: Shiseido (acquired 2019)

Drunk Elephant is a Houston-based skincare brand that was acquired by Shiseido in 2019 for $845 million. The brand was originally founded in 2012 by Tiffany Masterson as part of the clean beauty movement, and had its public launch in August 2013.

After its launch, Drunk Elephant became one of Sephora's fastest-growing brands, partly due to its popularity among younger consumers, including preteens who discovered the brand through TikTok videos featuring "skincare smoothies".

Drunk Elephant is the fourth most popular skincare brand in the US.

== History ==
Drunk Elephant was founded in 2012 by Tiffany Masterson, a Houston-based mother of four. The company was established with initial investments from her brother-in-law and brother, the latter of whom became company president. After a year of engaging with consumers and refining the products, the brand officially launched in August 2013.

In 2014, Drunk Elephant attended the Cosmoprof trade show, where it was noticed by Sephora. The brand launched with the retailer in January 2015, becoming a top-selling and fast-growing skincare brand for the company. In March 2017, Drunk Elephant secured a minority investment from the private equity firm VMG Partners and Leandra Medine to fund international expansion and scale operations. By 2018, the company's net sales reached nearly $100 million.

In October 2019, the Japanese cosmetics group Shiseido acquired Drunk Elephant for $845 million. At the time, Drunk Elephant's global net sales for 2019 were $120 million. The valuation was estimated at over eight times the brand's 2018 net sales. Masterson remained with the company as Chief Creative Officer and President. Under Shiseido, the brand expanded its product lines into hair and body care in 2020 and launched in mainland China in 2024.

The brand has since faced challenges. In the first quarter of 2025, Shiseido reported a 65% year-over-year sales decline for Drunk Elephant, attributed to an "identity crisis" which alienated its core customer base.

== See also ==
- Urban Decay
- Bobbi Brown
- Shiseido
