= New Hampshire Marine Memorial =

Coordinates: 42°54′47″N 70°48′32″W

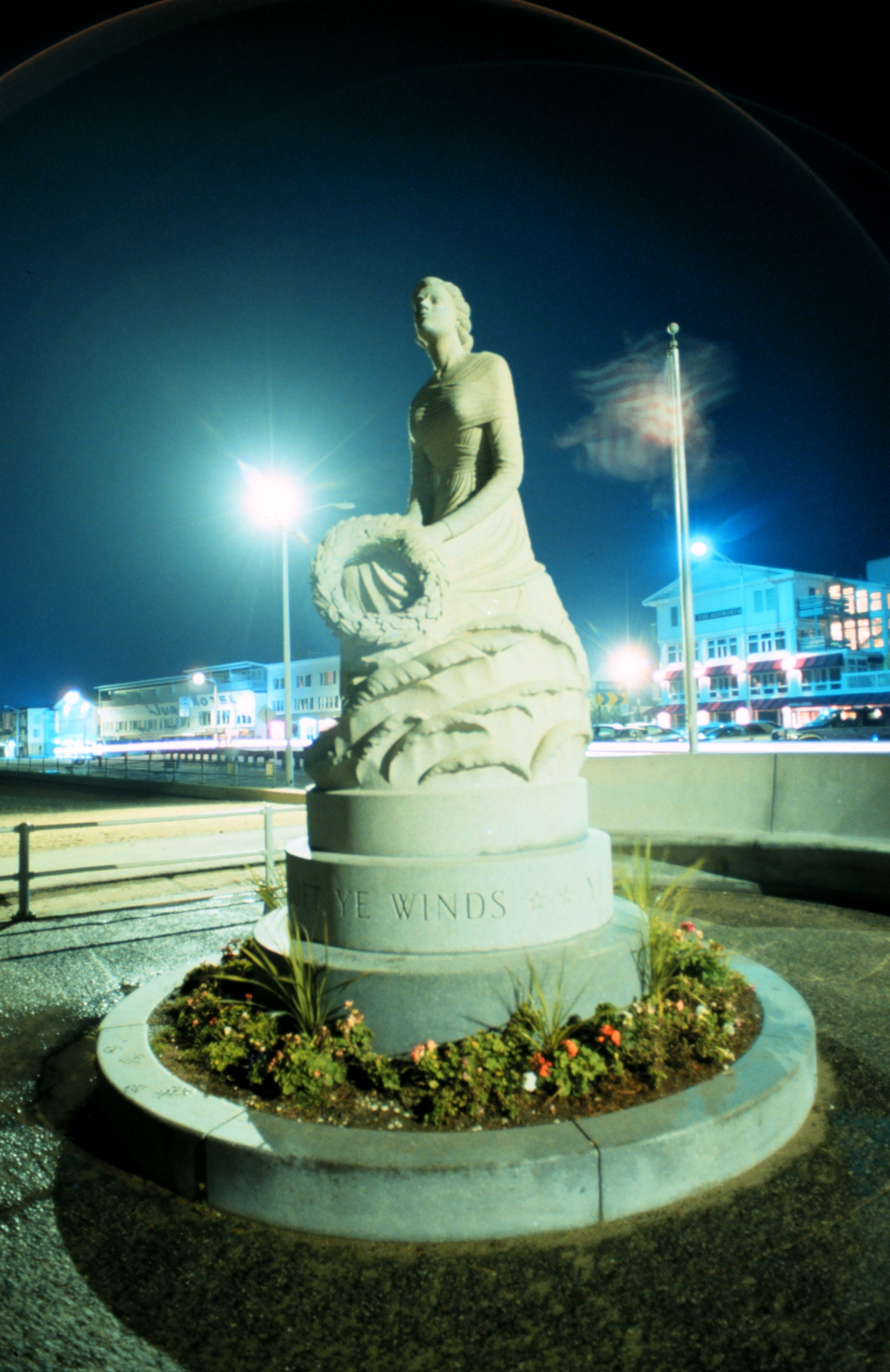
New Hampshire Marine Memorial

The New Hampshire Marine Memorial is a mid-sized statue of New England granite on a tiered granite base. Designed in Classical style by Concord, New Hampshire design expert Alice Ericson Cosgrove and sculpted by Vincenzo Andreani, the memorial, dedicated to all New Hampshire servicepersons lost at sea due to warfare, is located in Hampton Beach, New Hampshire and was dedicated May 30, 1957.

The statue depicts a kneeling woman gazing out to sea, a laurel wreath in her hands. Close by the statue is a quarter-circle of granite into which are cut the names of men lost to the sea.
