= Hampton Beach State Park =

State park in Rockingham County, New Hampshire

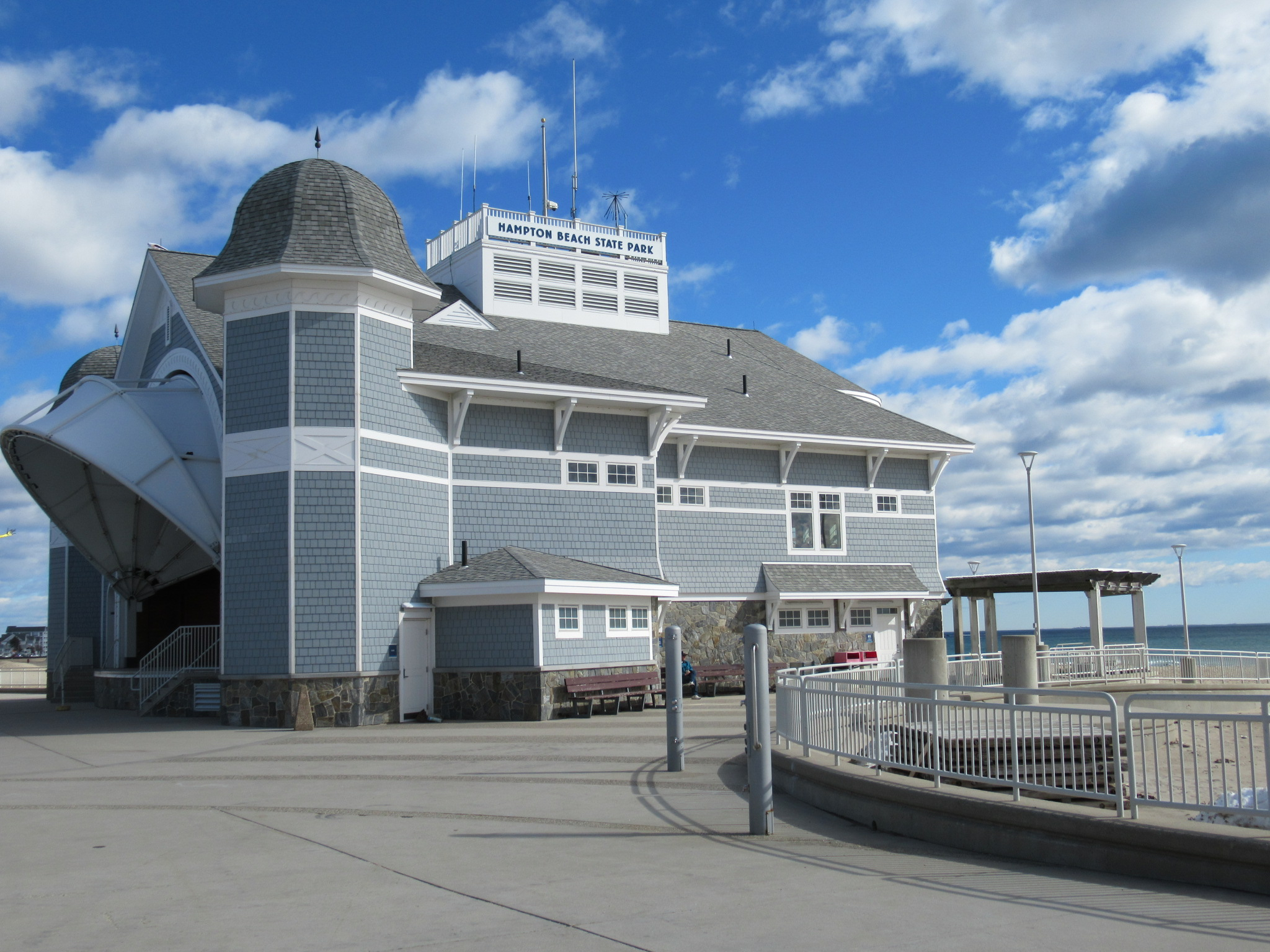
- The "Seashell" at Hampton Beach
- Interactive map of Hampton Beach State Park
- Location: Hampton Beach, Rockingham County, New Hampshire, United States
- Coordinates: 42°55′55″N 70°47′53″W
- Area: 50 acres (20 ha)
- Elevation: 10 feet (3.0 m)
- Established: 1933
- Administrator: New Hampshire Division of Parks and Recreation
- Website: Official website
New Hampshire State Parks
Hampton Beach State Park
- Location within New Hampshire Location within the United States

Hampton Beach State Park is a 50-acre (20 ha) state park in the community of Hampton Beach, New Hampshire, United States. It is located on the southeastern edge of New Hampshire on a peninsula where the Hampton River meets the Atlantic Ocean. Ocean Boulevard (New Hampshire Route 1A) forms the western edge of the park.

The park has a large beach with lifeguards, playground, an amphitheater, public information services, public restrooms, pavilion, comfort station and first aid. Activities in the park include swimming, fishing, picnicking, and RV camping with full hook-ups in the campground.
