= Hampton Beach Casino Ballroom =

Venue in New Hampshire, United States

Coordinates: 42°54′34″N 70°48′40″W

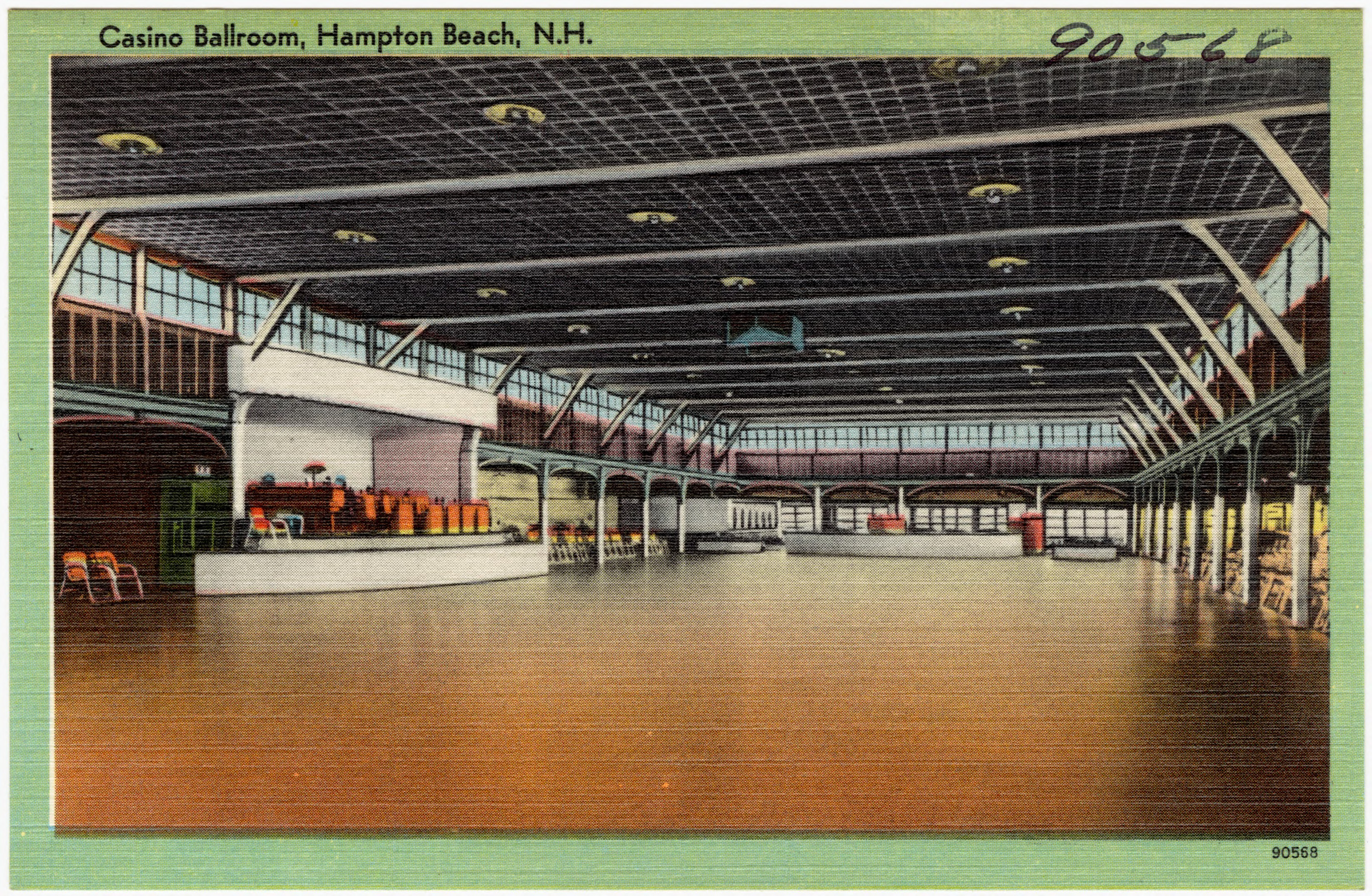
- Interior view of ballroom (c.1930s)
- Interactive map of Hampton Beach Casino Ballroom
- Former names: Club Casino (1976-92)
- Address: 169 Ocean Boulevard
- Location: Hampton Beach, New Hampshire
- Owner: Schaake family
- Capacity: 2,200

Construction
- Opened: July 4, 1899

Website
- www.casinoballroom.com

The Hampton Beach Casino Ballroom is a seasonal live music and comedy venue located on the boardwalk of Hampton Beach, New Hampshire, United States. The venue is open from April to November, and within those eight months schedules upwards of 70 shows.

In 2010, Pollstar ranked the Casino Ballroom #23 in the Top 100 Worldwide Club Venues.

== History ==
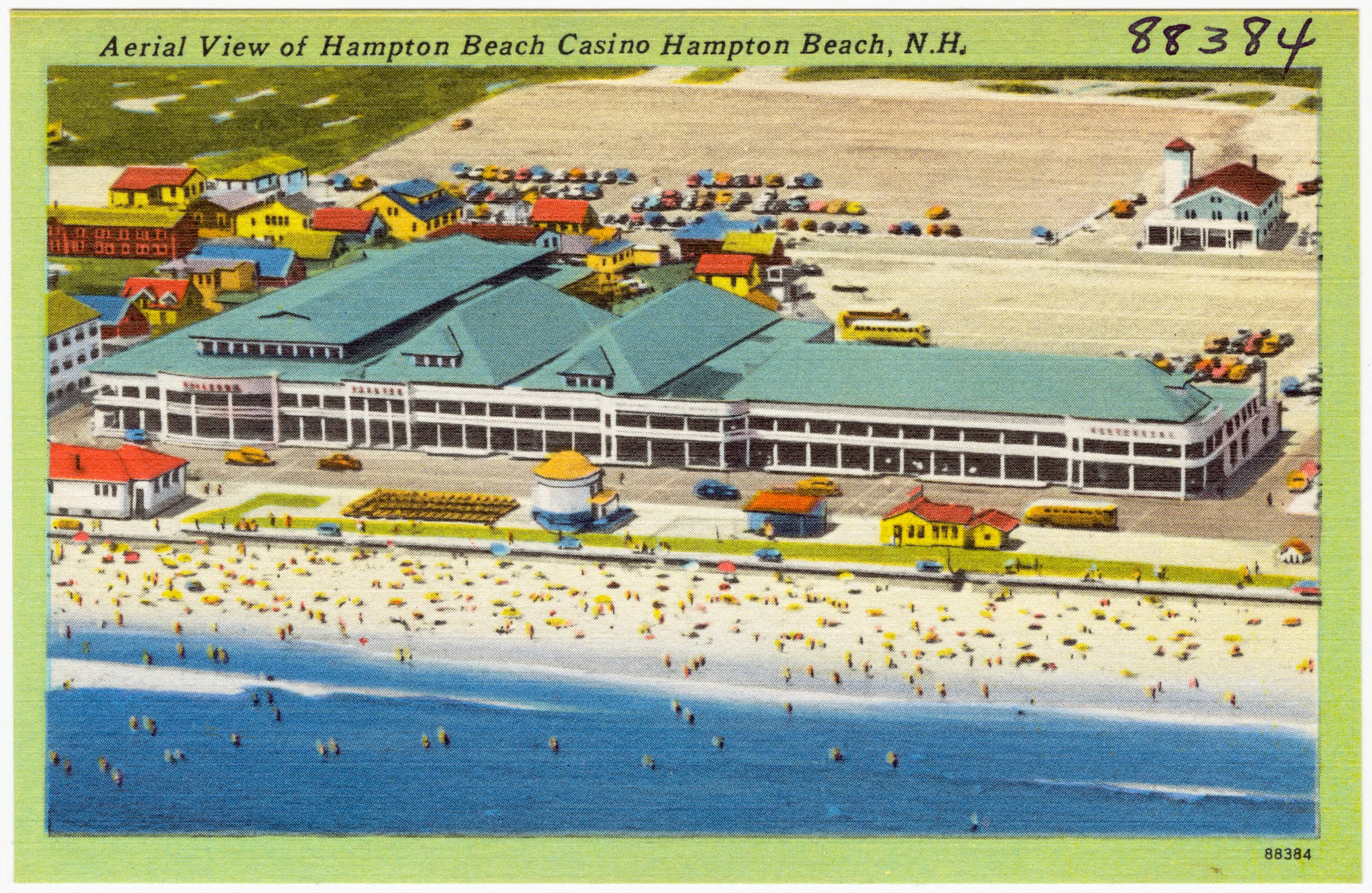
Aerial view of the casino during the late 1930s

The facility was opened on July 4, 1899, by Wallace D. Lovell, who owned the Exeter, Hampton and Amesbury Street Railway Company, with the hope of bringing more business and tourism into the Hampton Beach area. In 1927, with performers beginning to achieve national stardom through various media, the ballroom was added to adapt to the changing nature of entertainment. The new owners wanted a facility that could hold 5,000 people, and thus the Casino Ballroom was born. After the expansion, the Casino Ballroom boasted the largest dance floor in New England, and 20,000 people made use of the massive space on a weekly basis that hosted acts such as Bing Crosby and Duke Ellington.

The rise of rock and roll brought many more changes to the Casino Ballroom. The owners at the time sold the facility to a consortium of local businessmen interested in restoring it to its former glory. After renovating the facility and restoring many of its original features, the Ballroom reopened in the 1970s as Club Casino. Renovations, however, were not enough to draw promoters back to the venue. Seeing an opportunity, one of the new owners sought to book then-little-known names such as U2 and aging stars such as Ray Charles as a way of restoring the venue's reputation. His bet paid off, and following another renovation in the late '70s and early '80s, Club Casino began booking the likes of Jerry Seinfeld, Melissa Etheridge and Phish. So popular was the location, in fact, that it was able to fit 50 events into a three-month period, unheard of at the time for most music halls.

In the 1990s, the club started to develop a reputation for tough bouncers and strict rules against dancing. Again, changes were made to the Club Casino. In an attempt to regain some of its past glory, the name was changed back to the Hampton Beach Casino Ballroom, the facade of the building was redone, and the adjacent hotel demolished. The venue's season now extends from April to November, and it continues to bring in some of the top names in entertainment.

== Notable events ==
On July 8, 1971, an additional 4,000 fans showed up to an already sold-out Jethro Tull concert with Yes on their first American tour as a supporting band. Ticketless fans started rioting and scaling the walls to climb in through the windows. Police and the National Guard were called in, and the incident resulted in the town of Hampton banning rock concerts for a number of years.

On August 9, 1995, the day Jerry Garcia died, his former Grateful Dead bandmate Bob Weir and his band RatDog took the stage to play a show at the Casino. Fans and media outlets descended on the Ballroom, filling the venue's parking lot to hold a candlelight vigil while listening to the band play inside.

Micky Ward, professional boxer of The Fighter fame, fought Emanuel Augustus here on July 13, 2001. It was later named the 2001 Fight of the Year.

The Casino Ballroom is the only venue in the world that has hosted three generations of the Nelson family: Ozzie & Harriet Nelson in the 1930s, Ricky Nelson in the 1960s and '70s, and Matthew & Gunnar Nelson in the 1990s.

== Notable performers ==
The following are some of the more notable artists who have performed at the Casino Ballroom:

- Artie Shaw
- Barenaked Ladies
- The Beach Boys
- Bing Crosby
- Blues Traveler
- Bob Weir & RatDog
- Bonnie Raitt
- Buddy Guy
- Chicago
- Count Basie
- Creed
- The Doors
- Duke Ellington
- Eddie Money
- The 5th Dimension
- The Four Aces
- The Four Tops
- Frankie Lane
- George Carlin
- George Thorogood
- Guy Lombardo
- Glenn Miller
- Harry James
- Hootie & the Blowfish
- Huey Lewis and the News
- Janis Joplin
- Jerry Seinfeld
- Jethro Tull
- Jewel
- Jimi Hendrix
- Joan Rivers
- The Kingston Trio
- Led Zeppelin
- Live
- Louis Armstrong
- The Lovin' Spoonful
- Lyle Lovett
- Meat Loaf
- Melissa Etheridge
- The Mighty Mighty Bosstones
- The Monkees
- Paula Cole
- Peter, Paul and Mary
- Phish
- Ray Charles
- Robert Cray
- Roy Orbison
- Sam Kinison
- Sammy Hagar
- Sammy Kaye
- Sinéad O'Connor
- The Stray Cats
- The Supremes
- Tina Turner
- Tom Jones
- Tommy Dorsey
- U2
- The Village People
- Wayne Newton
- The Who
- Woody Herman
- Ziggy Marley
- 38 Special
