= Hampton Beach, New Hampshire =

Census-designated place in New Hampshire, United States

- Census-designated place
- Hampton Beach in 2026

- Location in Rockingham County and the state of New Hampshire.
- Coordinates: 42°54′52″N 70°48′42″W
- Country: United States
- State: New Hampshire
- County: Rockingham
- Town: Hampton

Area
  - Total: 1.49 sq mi (3.87 km^{2})
  - Land: 1.27 sq mi (3.30 km^{2})
  - Water: 0.22 sq mi (0.58 km^{2})
- Elevation: 07 ft (2.1 m)

Population (2020)
  - Total: 2,598
  - Density: 2,041.7/sq mi (788.29/km^{2})
- Time zone: UTC−5 (Eastern (EST))
  - Summer (DST): UTC−4 (EDT)
- ZIP Codes: 03842–03843
- Area code: 603
- FIPS code: 33-33140
- GNIS feature ID: 2629723
- Website: www.hamptonbeach.org

Hampton Beach is a village district, census-designated place, and beach resort in the town of Hampton, New Hampshire, United States, along the Atlantic Ocean. Its population at the 2020 census was 2,598. Hampton Beach is in Rockingham County, approximately 15 miles (24 km) south of Portsmouth. The community is a popular tourist destination and the busiest beach community in New Hampshire. Ocean Boulevard, the main street along the beach, includes a boardwalk, many shops and businesses, several seasonal hotels, and the Hampton Beach Casino Ballroom, which hosts national acts in the summer. Hampton Beach State Park was named one of four "Superstar" beaches in the United States in 2011, for having had perfect water-quality testing results in each of the previous three years.

== History ==
The Hampton Beach Village District was established on June 26, 1907, to provide electric power and water to the summer tourist community. In 1923, the village's first fire station was built, after two fires destroyed a large section of the beach settlement in 1919 and 1922. The original fire station was razed and replaced in 2014.

On February 26, 2010, a windstorm-fueled fire burned down all the buildings in a block at Hampton Beach, including the Surf Hotel, Happy Hampton Arcade, and Mrs. Mitchell's Gift Shop. The fire started in the Surf Hotel and was spread to the other buildings by high winds. The cause of this fire is unknown. The area has been rebuilt, with a larger hotel and a new Mrs. Mitchell's.

On July 29, 2023, a single-engine Piper PA-18 crashed off the shore of the beach. Only one person was aboard the aircraft at the time and was not injured.

== Geography ==
Most of the resort village lies on a barrier spit separated from the mainland by a large estuary system known as Hampton Harbor. The estuary serves as the mouth of several rivers, the largest being the Hampton River from the northwest. New Hampshire Route 1A serves as the main north-south route through the beach area, connecting the village to Seabrook Beach to the south (across the Hampton Bridge traversing the Hampton Harbor Inlet) and Little Boar's Head in North Hampton to the north. Access from the west is provided by three roads: New Hampshire Route 101 is the main access point to the densely populated southern resort area from most points west, while Winnacunnet Road (officially New Hampshire Route 101E) provides access to the less developed areas in the northern part of the village near a large salt marsh conservation area. Winnacunnet Road marks the northern edge of the census-designated place, but New Hampshire Route 27, known locally as High Street, marks the northern edge of the resort area.

The heaviest development lies south of the Ashworth-by-the-Sea hotel, located at the eastern terminus of NH 101 where it meets NH 1A, known locally as Ocean Boulevard. From this point south, NH 1A splits into two one-way streets: the southbound Ashworth Avenue, and the northbound Ocean Boulevard. Cross streets through this area run from A Street in the north to M Street in the south. The southern end of the spit is mostly state park, with little to no buildings or development. North of the junction of 101 and 1A, the area is much less developed, dominated mostly by a large salt marsh conservation area, with small businesses and bungalows along Ocean Boulevard (NH 1A). North of Winnacunnet Road (and outside the CDP), a second area of heavier development begins with Kings Highway parallel to Ocean Boulevard, and cross streets numbered from 1st Street in the south to 19th Street in the north. The resort ends at the Windjammer Hotel at its northern end, at the junction of NH 27 and NH 1A.

The census-designated place (CDP) portion of Hampton Beach extends from the Seabrook town line in the south to Winnacunnet Road in the north. The western border, separating it from the Hampton CDP, follows Tide Mill Creek within the Hampton Saltmarsh, and the eastern border is the Atlantic Ocean shoreline. According to the U.S. Census Bureau, the Hampton Beach CDP has a total area of 1.49 square miles (3.87 km^{2}), of which 1.27 square miles (3.30 km^{2}) are land and 0.22 square miles (0.58 km^{2}), or 14.88%, are water.

== Demographics ==
Historical population
Census	Pop.	Note	%±
2010	2,275		—
2020	2,598		14.2%
U.S. Decennial Census

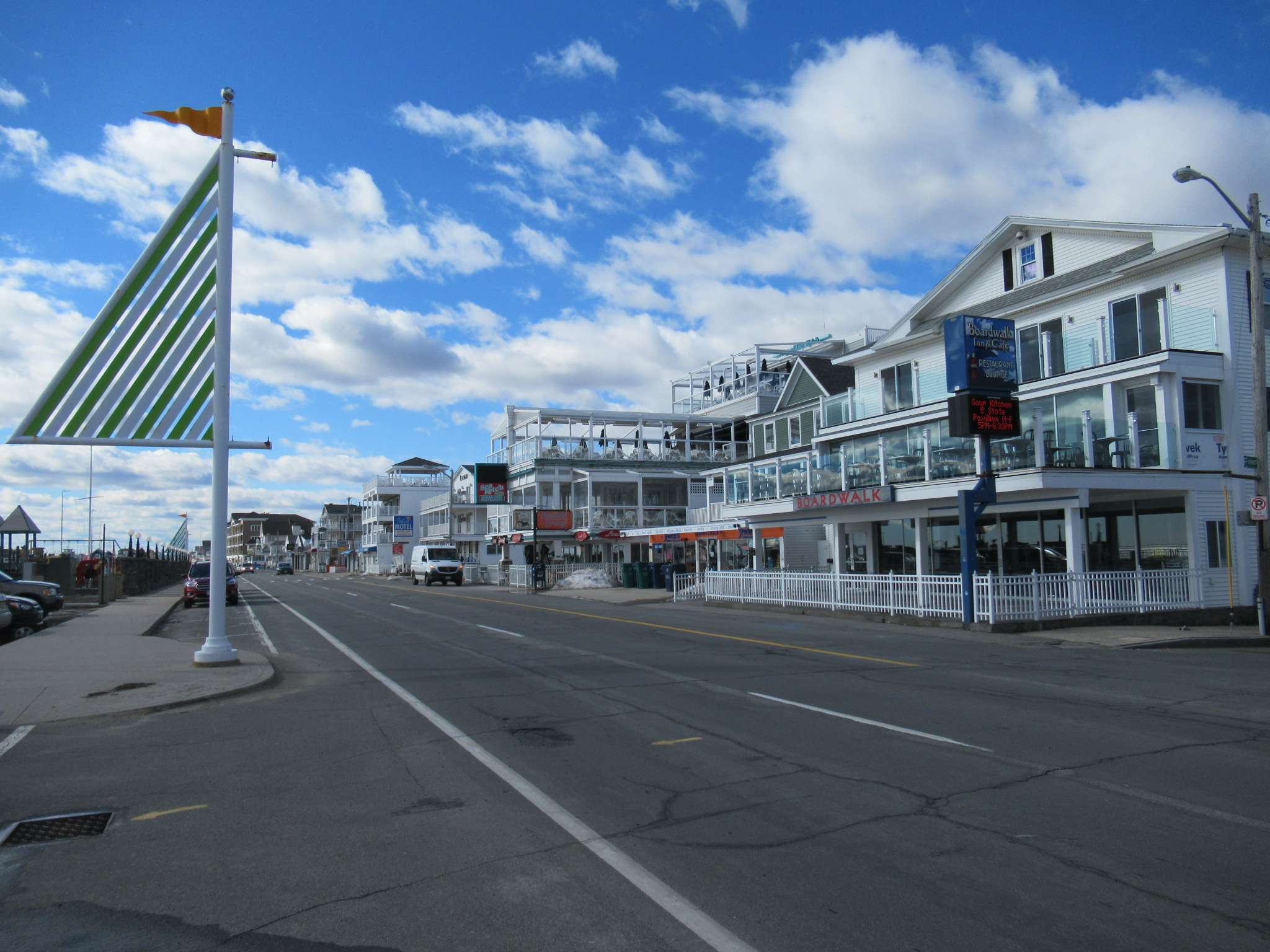
Ocean Boulevard in Hampton Beach, March 2019

=== 2020 census ===
As of the 2020 census, Hampton Beach had a population of 2,598. The median age was 56.8 years. 7.8% of residents were under the age of 18 and 27.3% of residents were 65 years of age or older. For every 100 females there were 102.3 males, and for every 100 females age 18 and over there were 104.4 males age 18 and over.

100.0% of residents lived in urban areas, while 0.0% lived in rural areas.

There were 1,473 households in Hampton Beach, of which 8.2% had children under the age of 18 living in them. Of all households, 33.7% were married-couple households, 29.3% were households with a male householder and no spouse or partner present, and 28.4% were households with a female householder and no spouse or partner present. About 46.3% of all households were made up of individuals and 14.6% had someone living alone who was 65 years of age or older.

There were 3,114 housing units, of which 52.7% were vacant. The homeowner vacancy rate was 1.6% and the rental vacancy rate was 13.3%.

Racial composition as of the 2020 census
Race	Number	Percent
White	2,431	93.6%
Black or African American	12	0.5%
American Indian and Alaska Native	0	0.0%
Asian	27	1.0%
Native Hawaiian and Other Pacific Islander	1	0.0%
Some other race	19	0.7%
Two or more races	108	4.2%
Hispanic or Latino (of any race)	74	2.8%

=== 2010 census ===
As of the census of 2010, there were 2,275 people, 1,227 households, and 555 families residing in the CDP. There were 3,158 housing units, of which 1,931, or 61.1%, were vacant on Census Day. 1,443 of the vacant units were seasonal or vacation rental units. The racial makeup of the CDP was 95.8% white, 0.4% African American, 0.3% Native American, 0.7% Asian, 0.04% Pacific Islander, 0.8% some other race, and 1.9% from two or more races. 1.6% of the population were Hispanic or Latino of any race.

Of the 1,227 households in the CDP, 14.3% had children under the age of 18 living with them, 31.6% were headed by married couples living together, 9.0% had a female householder with no husband present, and 54.8% were non-families. 45.0% of all households were made up of individuals, and 9.1% were someone living alone who was 65 years of age or older. The average household size was 1.83, and the average family size was 2.49.

12.0% of residents in the CDP were under the age of 18, 6.6% were from age 18 to 24, 23.6% were from 25 to 44, 41.7% were from 45 to 64, and 16.0% were 65 years of age or older. The median age was 49.3 years. For every 100 females, there were 109.9 males. For every 100 females age 18 and over, there were 110.0 males.

=== Income and poverty ===
For the period 2011-15, the estimated median annual income for a household was $53,095, and the median income for a family was $78,929. Male full-time workers had a median income of $56,875 versus $70,461 for females. The per capita income for the CDP was $48,728. 14.8% of the population and 12.7% of families were below the poverty line, along with 44.7% of people under the age of 18 and 0.0% of people 65 or older.

== Attractions and events ==
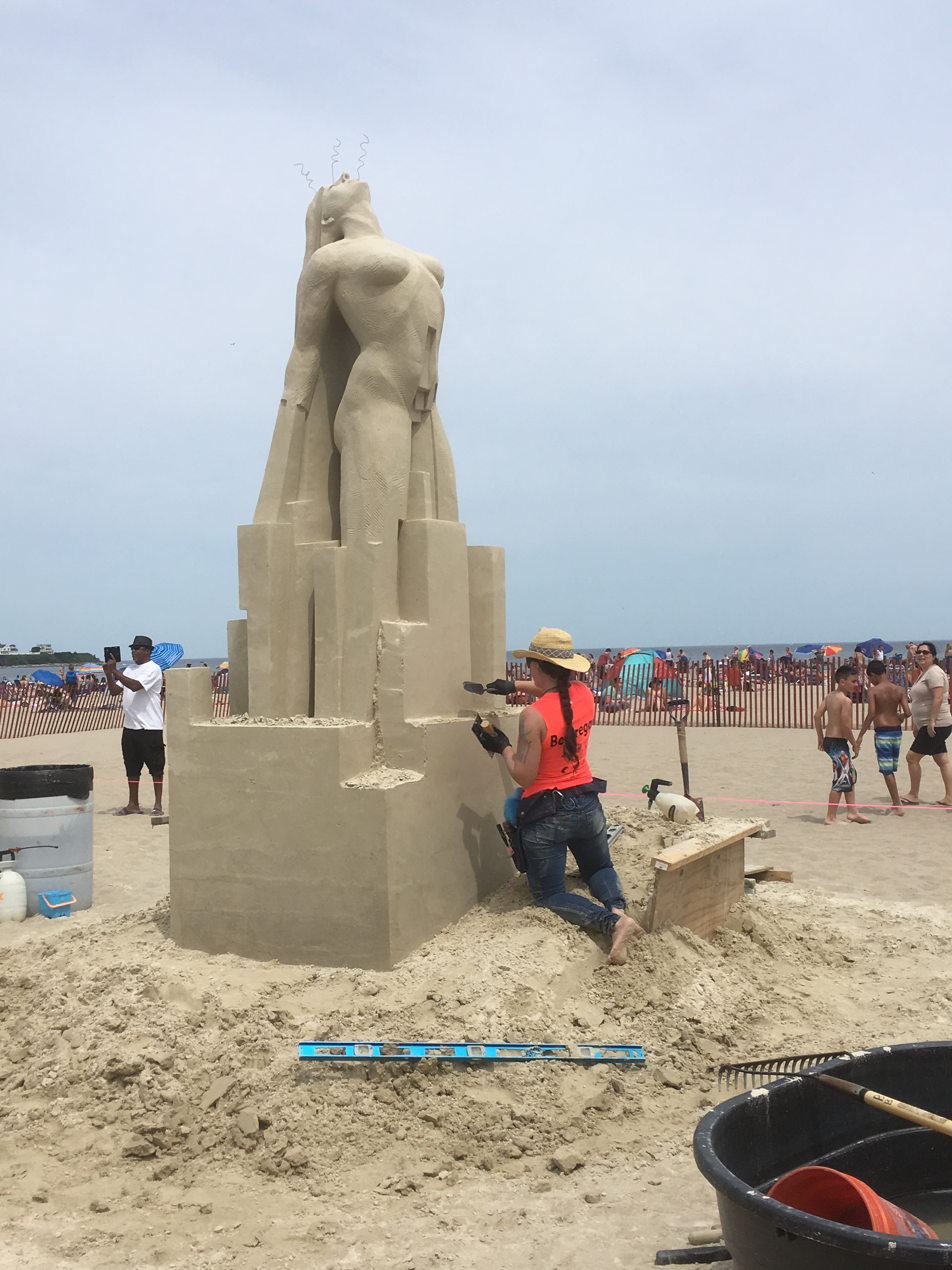
A sand sculpture at the 2018 Hampton Beach Master Sand Sculpting Classic

The New Hampshire Marine Memorial is located on the beach along Route 1A at the terminus of New Hampshire Route 101.

The Hampton Bridge carries Route 1A south across the Hampton Harbor inlet into Seabrook.

The Hampton Beach Casino Ballroom has been the center attraction at Hampton Beach for more than 100 years. The Ballroom continues to draw some of the top names in entertainment. Recently, the Ballroom placed in the top 30 for worldwide ticket sales in venues under 3,000 seats.

Hampton Beach Seafood Festival - Since 1988, the Hampton Area Chamber of Commerce and Seafood Festival Committee have helped put New Hampshire on the map as a vacation destination. The Hampton Beach Seafood Festival has a profound effect on seacoast businesses, the community, and the overall economy of the area. Restaurants, lodging, shops, and businesses in general depend on the Seafood Festival as the primary contributor to their bottom line. Many Chamber members say it is even bigger than the "4th of July" in sales volume. The Festival, held the weekend after Labor Day, is also instrumental in extending the summer season. Dozens of non-profit organizations also earn a major portion of their income through revenues earned at the Festival, allowing them to continue to support their causes that benefit the citizens of New Hampshire. Event attendance is now estimated as exceeding 150,000. Hampton Beach Sand Sculpture Competition - Since 2001, the Hampton Area Chamber of Commerce has sponsored, with the help of Seaside Hotel, a sand sculpture competition that has brought numerous sculptors from across America to Hampton Beach in mid-June. The 4 day contest is seen by thousands and then put up for illumination for two weeks. Prizes (top prize of $50,000) are rewarded via fan voting and through the Chamber.

There are fireworks on the 4th of July and every Wednesday of the summer at 9:30 pm. There are also fireworks held to cap the Hampton Beach Seafood Festival in September, with a launch scheduled for that Saturday at 8:15 pm.
