= Zadig&Voltaire =

French fashion retailer

Zadig&Voltaire is a French fashion brand founded in Paris in 1997 by Thierry Gillier, son of André Gillier, the owner and president of a large French knitwear manufacturing firm and cofounder of Lacoste. The brand produces edgy, rock-and-roll-inspired style often incorporating motifs like skulls or angel wings for women, men, and children. It directly operates stores worldwide and is available through Nordstrom, Bloomingdale's, Neiman Marcus, and Saks Fifth Avenue.

== Etymology ==
Zadig is a 1747 novella by Voltaire.

== Marketing ==
Paris Jackson modeled for Zadig&Voltaire's Fall/Winter 2025 campaign.

== History ==
In 2012, Erin Wasson and Camille Rowe represented the brand. In 2014, Freja Beha designed a capsule collection for the brand, with a portion of the profits donated to Doctors Without Borders. In 2017, Bella Hadid became the face of the brand. In 2018, Eva Herzigová appeared in the brand's advertising campaigns. Kate Moss collaborated with the company on the Kate bag. Yvan Attal was the brand's ambassador in 2015, and Gabriel Kane Day-Lewis succeeded him in 2016. In 2018, the ambassador was supermodel Werner Schreyer, followed by Rafferty Law in 2022.

In 2025, co-founders Thierry and Arnaud Gillier acquired jewelry brands Maison Poiray and Aurélie Bidermann.

In January 2024, Cecilia Bönström, who had been the artistic director since 2006, left the company and was replaced by Thierry Gillier.
