= Ashlee Simpson discography =

Cataloging of published recordings by Ashlee Simpson

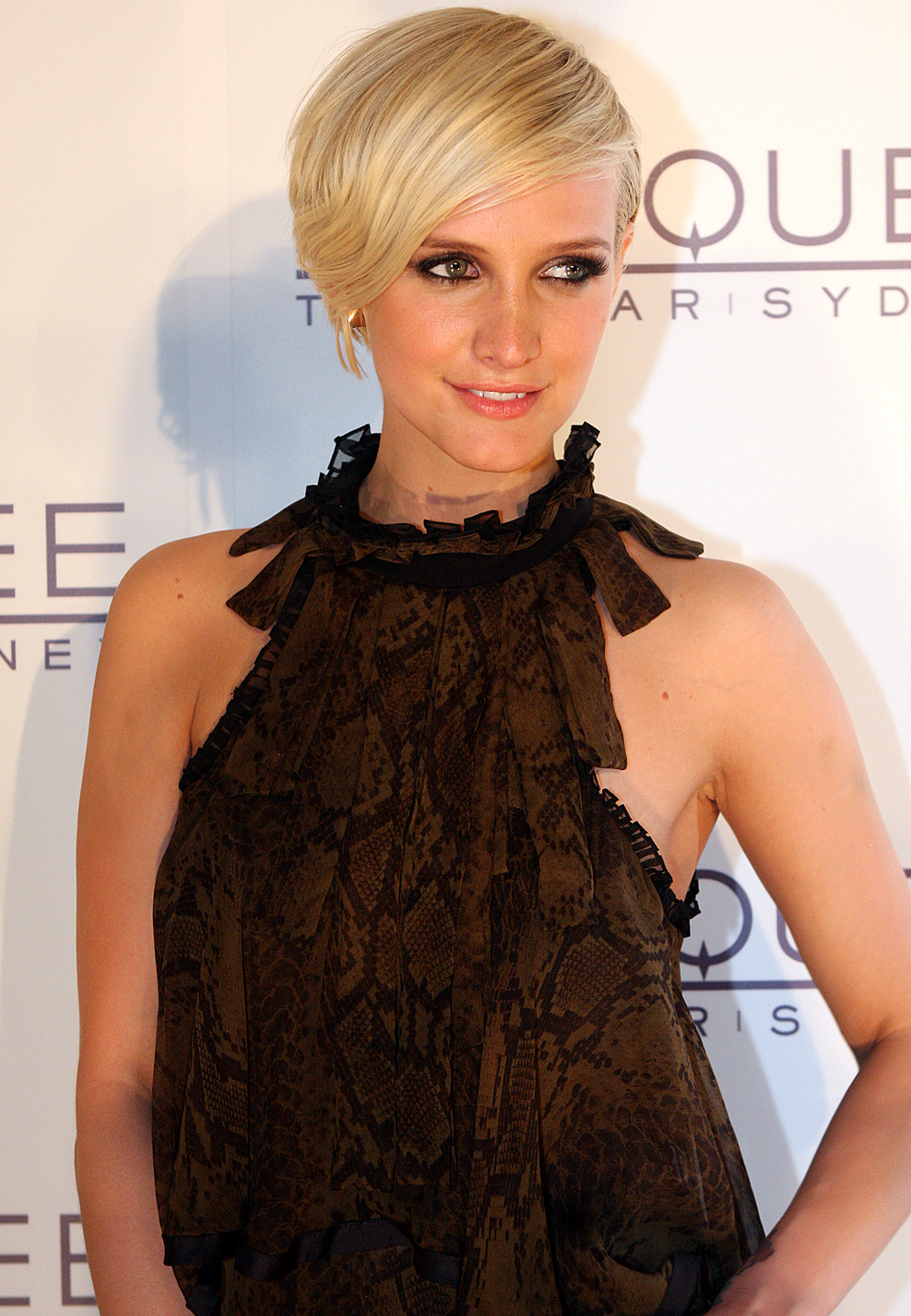
- Simpson in 2012
- Studio albums: 3
- Singles: 9
- Music videos: 9
- Other appearances: 5

American singer-songwriter Ashlee Simpson has released three studio albums, nine singles, and nine music videos. Simpson debuted as an actress in 2001, appearing on the television series 7th Heaven. In 2003, she began composing solo material and signed a recording contract with Geffen Records in the United States.

Simpson's debut album Autobiography was released in July 2004. The album, composed of pop rock songs, reached number one on the US Billboard 200 albums chart, and was certified Platinum three times by the Recording Industry Association of America (RIAA). On the United Kingdom albums chart, it reached number thirty-one and was certified Gold by the British Phonographic Industry (BPI). The album sold three million copies in the US and produced three singles. Simpson's debut single, "Pieces of Me", reached number five on the US Billboard Hot 100 and number one on the US Billboard Pop Airplay chart. "Pieces of Me" was certified Gold by the RIAA. "La La", her third single, reached number eighty-six in the US and was certified Gold by the RIAA.

Simpson's second album, I Am Me, was released in October 2005. It debuted at number one in the US and was later certified Platinum by the RIAA. In the UK, the album reached number fifty. I Am Me sold 900,000 copies in the US and spawned two top forty singles. The album's lead single "Boyfriend", reached number eight in Australia, Simpson's second highest peak at the time, and was certified Gold by ARIA. The next single "L.O.V.E." reached number five in Australia and number twenty-two in the US. A stand-alone single released in 2006, "Invisible", reached number twenty-one in the US. Bittersweet World, Simpson's third album, was released in April 2008. The album reached number four in the US and number fifty-seven in the UK. Its singles were not successful in the US. "Little Miss Obsessive", featuring guest vocals from Tom Higgenson of Plain White T's reached number ninety-six on the Billboard Hot 100 and seventy-two in Canada. "Outta My Head (Ay Ya Ya)" failed to chart in US, but was successful in Australia, reaching the top 20 and peaking at number twenty-four in UK. In 2012, Simpson released the promotional single "Bat for a Heart" independently. In 2018, she formed a duo with husband Evan Ross and released an eponymous extended play, Ashlee + Evan, through Access Records.

== Studio albums ==
Title	Album details	Peak chart positions										Certifications
Title	Album details	US	AUS	AUT	CAN	GER	IRE	JPN	NOR	SWI	UK	Certifications
Autobiography	Released: July 20, 2004; Label: Geffen (B000291302); Formats: CD, LP, digital download, streaming	1	40	37	8	27	22	6	29	36	31	RIAA: 3× Platinum; BPI: Gold; MC: 2× Platinum; RIAJ: Gold
I Am Me	Released: October 18, 2005; Label: Geffen (B000543602); Formats: CD, LP, digital download, streaming	1	35	60	4	—	—	13	—	—	50	RIAA: Platinum; MC: Gold
Bittersweet World	Released: April 22, 2008; Label: Geffen (B001023102); Formats: CD, digital download, streaming	4	41	55	8	88	16	41	—	—	57	
"—" denotes a recording that did not chart.

== Singles ==
Title	Year	Peak chart positions											Certifications	Album
Title	Year	US	US Pop	AUS	AUT	CAN	GER	IRE	NOR	NZL	SWI	UK	Certifications	Album
"Pieces of Me"	2004	5	1	7	15	—	26	10	3	32	11	4	RIAA: Gold; ARIA: Gold	Autobiography
"Shadow"	2004	57	14	31	60	—	42	—	—	—	30	—		Autobiography
"La La"	2004	86	28	10	46	—	68	16	—	11	—	11	RIAA: Gold; ARIA: Gold	Autobiography
"Boyfriend"	2005	19	20	8	45	—	56	13	19	21	—	12	ARIA: Gold	I Am Me
"L.O.V.E."	2005	22	27	5	—	—	—	—	—	12	—	—	ARIA: Gold	I Am Me
"Invisible"	2006	21	—	—	—	—	—	—	—	—	—	—		Non-album single
"Outta My Head (Ay Ya Ya)"	2007	— (Note: "Outta My Head (Ay Ya Ya)" did not enter the Billboard Hot 100, but peaked at number 21 on the Bubbling Under Hot 100 chart.)	—	16	71	59	30	15	—	—	—	24		Bittersweet World
"Little Miss Obsessive"	2008	96	—	—	—	72	—	—	—	—	—	—		Bittersweet World
"Bat for a Heart"	2012	—	—	—	—	—	—	—	—	—	—	—		Non-album single
"—" denotes a recording that did not chart.

== Music videos ==
Title	Year	Director
"Pieces of Me"	2004	Stefan Smith
"Shadow"	2004	Liz Friedlander
"La La"	2004	Joseph Kahn
"Undiscovered"*	2005	Meiert Avis
"Boyfriend"	2005	Marc Webb
"L.O.V.E."	2005	Diane Martel
"Invisible"	2006	Marc Webb
"Outta My Head (Ay Ya Ya)"	2007	Alan Ferguson
"Bat for a Heart"	2012	Kristin Burns & Justin Coloma

- * The music video for "Undiscovered" is footage from the 2005 film of the same name.

== Other appearances ==
Title	Year	Album
"Christmas Past, Present and Future"	2002	School's Out! Christmas
"Just Let Me Cry"	2003	Freaky Friday Original Soundtrack
"The Little Drummer Boy" (with Jessica Simpson)	2004	Rejoyce: The Christmas Album
"Irresistible" (Ty & Kory featuring Snoop Dogg and Ashlee Simpson)	2008	Raw & Bangin' Mixtape Vol. 2

== See also ==
- Ashlee + Evan (for a list of recordings as part of the duo with her husband Evan Ross)
