= Bittersweet World =

Studio album by Ashlee Simpson
- Released: April 22, 2008
- Recorded: March 2006 – January 2008
- Genre: Dance-pop
- Length: 39:58
- Label: Geffen
- Producers: Ashlee Simpson; Jim Beanz; Dashawn "Happie" White; Karl Berringer; Ron Fair; Jerome "J-Roc" Harmon; Tal Herzberg; Chad Hugo; Kenna; King Logan; Jack Joseph Puig; John Shanks; Timbaland

Ashlee Simpson chronology
I Am Me (2005)	Bittersweet World (2008)

Singles from Bittersweet World
- 1. "Outta My Head (Ay Ya Ya)" Released: December 11, 2007; 2. "Little Miss Obsessive" Released: March 11, 2008

Bittersweet World is the third studio album by American singer-songwriter Ashlee Simpson. It was released in the United States on April 22, 2008. The project is her final release through Geffen Records. As of 2026, Bittersweet World is also her latest LP to date.

The album marked a departure for Simpson, who executive produced the record and shifted her sound in a more dance-pop direction. Wanting to experiment with new sounds to make a "fun party album", she enlisted multiple producers including Timbaland, Jerome Harmon, Chad Hugo of The Neptunes, and Kenna.

Bittersweet World was not as successful as Autobiography or I Am Me. It reached the top 20 in Canada, Ireland, and the United States. While the album's lead single, "Outta My Head (Ay Ya Ya)", also became her first to not appear on the Billboard Hot 100 chart in the US, the song was a moderate success in other territories. In early 2008, Simpson promoted the album with a small club tour. Plans for a summer tour were canceled when she announced her pregnancy. The album has been lauded by critics for its 1980s-infused electropop sound.

== Background ==
In November 2006, after completing her run as Roxie Hart in the London production of the musical Chicago, Simpson said that she was going to meet with record executives soon to begin work on her third album. Geffen Records chairman Ron Fair said in early December that plotting Simpson's musical direction would be "very tricky" because of press scrutiny, but that he would work with Simpson to overcome industry doubts about her musical credibility "because she deserves to be heard and she deserves a shot."

In March 2007, Simpson said her next album would have "a more soulful sound" and that she was writing with a wider group of artists in comparison to her previous albums. Later that month, Simpson was reportedly writing with Timbaland, Kenna and Chad Hugo. She was also said to be working with John Legend, Beth Hart, and Tim Rice-Oxley of Keane. Though it was initially reported that Simpson was also working with The Cure frontman Robert Smith, both parties later denied a collaboration.

Although Simpson said her sound would stay in the pop rock realm, she also mentioned that her music was evolving and would have less emphasis on relationship troubles and breakups. She clarified, "This record is not like 'I didn't steal your boyfriend' or anything like that." Simpson expressed feeling less pressure to be successful with her third album, considering her previous two albums had already achieved chart success. She told CosmoGirl,

This time, I didn't feel like I have to prove myself—that's all behind me. I have a stronger vision for this record...I was able to challenge myself by stepping out of the box I was in and working with new sounds and new people. That ultimately yielded different results than what people might expect from me. This is a fun party album, and I get to be kind of cheeky for the first time...silly and quirky.

== Concept and artwork ==
Simpson told MTV News in December 2007 the album's title would be Bittersweet World, which is also the name of one of the album's songs. She previously considered the title Color Outside the Lines, a line from the song "Rule Breaker". She described the title Bittersweet World as reflecting how she "feel[s] about the world right now" and later said that the song itself is "about how with the bad comes the good in pretty much every situation and vice versa. There are hard things, but you always have to find the positive." Simpson did the photoshoot for the album with photographer Ben Watts in Los Angeles. The photoshoot took place while Simpson still had blonde hair; she subsequently dyed it red in January 2008.

== Recording and production ==
For Bittersweet World, Simpson worked with hit producers like Timbaland, King Logan of The Royal Court, Chad Hugo of The Neptunes, Kenna, Jack Joseph Puig, Jim Beanz, and J-Roc. John Shanks returned as producer, in addition to Simpson's collaborative partner and band guitarist Ray Brady, who introduced Simpson to the sounds of 1980s band Missing Persons. Timbaland, who "tapped into Simpson's love of '80s music," worked on six songs, while others were guided by Hugo and Kenna. Two tracks, "Outta My Head (Ay Ya Ya)" and "Ragdoll", were written with indie artist Santigold. "Murder" originally featured a rap from Gym Class Heroes frontman Travie McCoy, but he was replaced by Izza Kizza on the album version. "Little Miss Obsessive", a pop rock power ballad, is a duet with Tom Higgenson of the Plain White T's.

Simpson wrote or co-wrote all of the album's songs, saying "This is my art and it's personal. If someone else writes the song without my input, it doesn't feel honest." At the 2007 MTV Video Music Awards, Simpson gave MTV a sneak peek of the album, describing the sound as being more beat-based in contrast to her previous guitar-driven sound. Simpson revealed the record was completed in November 2007, but that she was also continuing to write in anticipation of a March 2008 release.

== Music and lyrics ==
There's a song on the record called "Bittersweet World." And it is, to me. The song is saying that, and "Why can't we all just get along?" It's a tongue-in-cheek kind of thing, but it really is one of those love-to-hate kind of things.

— Simpson talks about the title track "Bittersweet World".

Bittersweet World contains influences from '70s and '80s music, particularly synth-pop and new wave. Simpson said she was inspired by women like Chrissie Hynde, Debbie Harry and Pat Benatar, because "they are strong and vulnerable simultaneously, yet they still make you want to dance." The Timbaland-produced "Outta My Head (Ay Ya Ya)" has been compared to the sound of Missing Persons. Simpson said the song is a get-out-of-my-head track, saying, "I just have too many voices in my head, everyone having their own opinion."

"Boys", written with Chad Hugo and Kenna, is a pop disco song. "Boys" was likened to "The Cardigans' 'Lovefool' atop a Chic rhythm", while People called it "the best Kylie Minogue song that Kylie never did". "Little Miss Obsessive," "Rule Breaker," "What I've Become," and "Ragdoll" stick more to Simpson's rock roots, with "Ragdoll" described as having "a 'Beat It' vibe" and featuring "Casio-esque keyboard tinkling and driving guitars". “Rule Breaker," a "Pat Benatar-like fist-pumper", was named by Rolling Stone as one of the 100 Best Singles of 2008. Of "Rule Breaker," Simpson said it was an attempt to "capture that badass feeling you get sometimes after watching a movie like True Romance. You think you can take on the world and you want to color outside the lines and get a tattoo or mouth off to someone way bigger than you". Rolling Stone noted "What I've Become" as an "excellent coming-of-age anthem" and "a paparazzi kiss-off with an appealingly honest chorus: 'I’ve just begun to find my way.'"

Billboard characterized "Murder" as having a "dark, hypnotic groove", and being "filled with beats and synth lines". Simpson said the lyrics of "Murder" "aren't serious, based on a true story or a threat....It's a metaphor about a girl who can get away with murder because of who she is." Like "Murder", Simpson has said "Hot Stuff" "is meant to be a fun song.... A lot of things on the record are laughing at situations, poking fun at things. With that, when you go somewhere and girls give you the mean eye. You're like, 'oh, wow – this is crazy.' 'Hot Stuff' makes fun of that. That song is meant to be a good time."

Simpson co-wrote and co-produced “Never Dream Alone” with Kenna. The song is a spare ballad that is “stripped down to piano, strings, and vocals,” with Simpson citing it as her favorite on the album. The Houston Chronicle said the title track "Bittersweet World" has "the snap-and-wink of a showtune”. According to Simpson, the lyrics are about people coming together and not judging each other". "No Time for Tears" was described as a "melancholy ballad" that "segues spooky Eurythmics verses into a pop-punk chorus".

== Release and promotion ==
Bittersweet World was originally eyed for an October 2007 release and production and recording was reportedly completed that November. However, the actual release date was shifted multiple times, beginning with a delay to the first quarter of 2008. On February 5, 2008, Simpson released a three-song digital EP, which contained the tracks “Outta My Head (Ay Ya Ya),” “Rule Breaker,” and a track from I Am Me, “Catch Me When I Fall”. Though Bittersweet World's release was expected in March, its new date was revealed to be April 15 as Simpson did promotional radio interviews. The album was officially released on April 22.

In December 2007, Simpson said she planned to do a “smaller club tour” for the album. The 13-city tour began in January 2008 at the Myst Club in Scottsdale, Arizona, and ended at Mansion in Miami Beach in March. Simpson, accompanied by her guitar player and a DJ, sang four songs as part of her set—three from Bittersweet World and "L.O.V.E" from I Am Me. After the tour ended, Simpson spoke of plans of doing a House of Blues tour with her band for the summer.

Leading up to and following the album’s release, Simpson made in-store appearances at Walmart and appeared on various TV shows, including the Nickelodeon Kids' Choice Awards. Simpson also did promotion in Europe, performing “Outta My Head” on The Paul O’Grady Show and on BBC Sounds. Clothing retailer Wet Seal partnered with Simpson for a collection of tops designed by the singer to coincide with the album's release. In May 2008, Simpson confirmed her pregnancy, and summer tour plans were postponed and eventually canceled.

=== Singles ===
"Outta My Head (Ay Ya Ya)" was made available for listening on AOL Music on November 30, 2007 and was later released as Bittersweet World's lead single on December 11. Although the song received a positive reception from critics, it became Simpson's first single to not make the Billboard Hot 100 chart. This was attributed to the synth-pop song being too outside of Simpson's traditional rock sound to resonate with her core fans. Though it did not achieve success in the US, it charted in Europe and Australia.

“Little Miss Obsessive” was first played February 21 on Chicago's KISS FM DreX Morning Show. The song, on which Simpson sings with Tom Higgenson of Plain White T's, was more in line with Simpson's pop rock sound, and was subsequently announced as the second single and released on March 11. Though it did not have a music video, "Little Miss Obsessive" charted at number 96 on the Hot 100. Simpson performed "Little Miss Obsessive" on TRL, Today, The Tonight Show with Jay Leno, Ellen Show, Jimmy Kimmel Live!, and Dance on Sunset.

The song "Boys" was speculated to be the third single off the album, due to its promotion in ads and being performed by Simpson on Dancing With the Stars. Although Simpson stated in a May 2008 interview on a fan club website that "Boys" and "Rule Breaker" would be released as singles, she later stated in an August 2008 interview that "Little Miss Obsessive" would be the last single.

== Critical reception ==
Professional ratings
Aggregate scores
Source	Rating
Metacritic	62/100
Review scores
Source	Rating
AllMusic	4/5 stars
The Boston Phoenix	2.5/4 stars
Entertainment Weekly	B
The Guardian	4/5 stars
Los Angeles Times	1.5/4 stars
PopMatters	4/10
Rolling Stone	3/5 stars
Slant Magazine	2.5/5 stars
Tom Hull – on the Web	B+
USA Today	2/4 stars

Critical reactions to Bittersweet World were mostly positive. On Metacritic, the album holds a score of 62 out of 100 (indicating "generally favorable reviews”) based on 15 reviews. Much praise was given to the album's dance-pop sound and 1980s-influenced production. In a three-star review, Rolling Stone said Simpson "skillfully shifts her crunchy, guitar-driven pop to eighties-influenced electro-rock with the help of Timbaland and the Neptunes' Chad Hugo."

Stephen Thomas Erlewine wrote, “Where Avril [Lavigne] beat a retreat to the bratty punk-pop that brought her fame, Ashlee has pulled a red hoodie over her head, amped up the dance beats, revved up the '80s retro fetish, and created something that feels of the 2008 moment.” Entertainment Weekly gave the album a B grade, saying the album is filled with “polished hooks and pretty melodies" and has a "giddy neon energy.” The New York Times and People magazine both selected Bittersweet World as a critic’s choice pick, with the former saying the music “pays off in songs with crisp beats, teen-seeking choruses and cheerfully obvious lyrics", and that while the album “couldn’t be more calculated, that doesn’t prevent it from being catchy, too.”

Digital Spy said it was "easily the best album made by a Simpson sister". Many reviews compared Simpson's music to that of Gwen Stefani. Jill Menze of Billboard praised the album's fun bubblegum sound, but also noted while Bittersweet World "is a party worth attending...not much is missed if your invite got lost in the mail." Negative reviews said Simpson's dabbling in different musical genres resulted in a lack of cohesiveness, and that Simpson was merely imitating other artists. Elysa Gardner of USA Today called Bittersweet World "a collection of bouncy, banal homages to the '80s" and wrote Simpson, "aided by Timbaland, The Neptunes' Chad Hugo and others, channels Debbie Harry, Madonna and Toni Basil about as well as any girl who could afford the help." Others claimed Simpson lacked the vocal depth to pull off the songs, with Rashod Ollison of The Baltimore Sun writing, "Simpson's colorless voice adds absolutely nothing to the admittedly catchy tracks, which recycle just about every trend heard on mainstream pop radio." In a one-star rating, Andy Gill of The Independent wrote,"[Simpson's] voice is all attitude and no emotion, a textbook case of style over substance – and given the paucity of style, that's as insubstantial as it gets."

== Commercial performance ==
Bittersweet World debuted at number four on the U.S. Billboard 200, selling about 47,000 copies in its first week. This was a much weaker debut than those enjoyed by Autobiography (398,000 copies) and I Am Me (220,000 copies), both of which debuted at number one. The album went on to sell 126,000 copies by 2009, her least successful effort to date. As of 2025, the album has sold approximately 439,000 copies in the United States and 600,000 copies plus worldwide.

== Track listing ==
Bittersweet World — North American edition
No.	Title	Writer(s)	Producer(s)	Length
1.	"Outta My Head (Ay Ya Ya)"	Ashlee Simpson; King Logan; Jerome Harmon; Dashawn "Happie" White; Santi White; Kenna	Timbaland; Logan; Harmon; Jim Beanz^{[a]}	3:37
2.	"Boys"	Simpson; Chad Hugo; Kenna; Beanz	Hugo; Kenna; Jack Joseph Puig^{[b]}	3:31
3.	"Rule Breaker"	Simpson; Logan; Harmon; Beanz	Timbaland; Logan; Harmon; Beanz^{[a]}	3:20
4.	"No Time for Tears"	Simpson; Hugo; Kenna	Hugo; Kenna	3:36
5.	"Little Miss Obsessive"	Simpson; Beanz; Victor Valentine; Karl Berringer	Puig; Berringer; Beanz^{[a]}	3:42
6.	"Ragdoll"	Simpson; Logan; Harmon; S. White; Beanz	Timbaland; Logan; Harmon; Beanz^{[a]}; Kenna^{[a]}	3:34
7.	"Bittersweet World"	Simpson; Logan; Harmon; Kenna	Timbaland; Logan; Harmon; Beanz^{[a]}	4:10
8.	"What I've Become"	Simpson; Kenna; Logan; Harmon; Beanz	Timbaland; Logan; Harmon; Beanz^{[a]}; Demacio "Demo" Castellon^{[b]}	3:51
9.	"Hot Stuff"	Simpson; Hugo; Kenna; Beanz	Hugo; Kenna	3:13
10.	"Murder"	Simpson; Logan; Harmon; Beanz	Timbaland; Logan; Harmon; Beanz^{[a]}	4:02
11.	"Never Dream Alone"	Simpson; Kenna	Kenna; Simpson; Harmon^{[b]}	3:19
Total length:				39:55

Bittersweet World — FYE edition (bonus track)
No.	Title	Length
12.	"Can't Have It All"	3:53

Bittersweet World — Walmart edition (bonus download)
No.	Title	Length
12.	"I’m Out"	3:48

Bittersweet World — iTunes Store edition (bonus track)
No.	Title	Writer(s)	Length
12.	"Follow You Wherever You Go"	Simpson; Hugo; Kenna; Beanz	3:34
Total length:			43:29

Bittersweet World — International edition (bonus track)
No.	Title	Writer(s)	Producer(s)	Length
12.	"Invisible"	Kira Leyden; Jeff Andrea	Ron Fair; Tal Herzberg^{[c]}	3:45
Total length:				43:40

Bittersweet World — Japanese edition (bonus content)
No.	Title	Writer(s)	Producer(s)	Length
13.	"Outta My Head (Ay Ya Ya)" (DJ AM / Eli Escobar Remix)	Simpson; Logan; Harmon; White; Kenna	Timbaland; Logan; Harmon; Beanz^{[a]}	6:08
14.	"Outta My Head (Ay Ya Ya)" (music video)	Simpson; Logan; Harmon; White; Kenna	Timbaland; Logan; Harmon; Beanz^{[a]}	3:48
Total length:				53:36

Bittersweet World — European edition (bonus tracks)
No.	Title	Writer(s)	Producer(s)	Length
13.	"Pieces of Me"	Simpson; Kara DioGuardi; John Shanks	Shanks	3:37
14.	"Boyfriend"	Simpson; DioGuardi; Shanks	Shanks	2:59
Total length:				50:16

Bittersweet World — European digital edition (bonus tracks)
No.	Title	Writer(s)	Producer(s)	Length
15.	"Outta My Head (Ay Ya Ya)" (Dave Audé Club Dub)	Simpson; Logan; Harmon; White; Kenna	Timbaland; Logan; Harmon; Beanz^{[a]}	7:05
16.	"Outta My Head (Ay Ya Ya)" (Dave Audé Dub Instrumental)	Simpson; Logan; Harmon; White; Kenna	Timbaland; Logan; Harmon; Beanz^{[a]}	7:05
Total length:				64:26

Notes

- ^{^a} signifies a vocal producer
- ^{^b} signifies an additional producer
- ^{^c} signifies a co-producer
- "Little Miss Obsessive" features guest vocals from Tom Higginson of the Plain White T's.
- "Murder" features a rap from Izza Kizza.

== Charts ==
Chart (2008)	Peak position
Australian Albums (ARIA)	41
Austrian Albums (Ö3 Austria)	55
Canadian Albums (Billboard)	8
German Albums (Offizielle Top 100)	88
Irish Albums (IRMA)	16
Japanese Albums (Oricon)	41
Scottish Albums (Official Charts)	72
UK Albums (Official Charts)	57
US Billboard 200	4
