= The Strange Familiar =

American pop rock band

- Origin: Cuyahoga Falls, Ohio, United States
- Genres: Pop rock
- Years active: 2006–present
- Label: Krian Music Group
- Members: Kira Leyden (Andrea) (piano / vocals); Jeff Andrea (guitar); Frank Freeman (bass); Nicholas Sainato (drums)
- Website: http://www.thestrangefamiliar.com

The Strange Familiar is an American pop rock band from Cuyahoga Falls, Ohio. The group was originally formed in 2006 by the husband and wife singer-songwriter team Jeff Andrea and Kira Leyden, former members of the popular Akron, OH band Jaded Era. Their first single, "Courage Is...", gained them significant attention after it was heavily promoted on ABC Family to launch a brand new series. In 2012, the band was featured on mtvU, Season 3 of the hit series The Vampire Diaries and Pretty Little Liars. Other members include fellow Ohio natives Frank Freeman (bass) and Nicholas Sainato (drums).

== History ==
=== Early years ===
Kira Leyden and Jeff Andrea first met in grammar school in Cuyahoga Falls, OH. "I was in seventh grade when I saw Jeff's band playing Pearl Jam's ‘Yellow Ledbetter’ at our school dance," Leyden recalls. "The singer forgot the words and walked off the stage, and I remember thinking, ‘I could do better than that!’". A life long partnership sprang from that serendipitous beginning, forged by their mutual love of music. Their first gig together was a grade-school dance. By the time they were in high school, their band had morphed into Jaded Era, one of the top indie groups in the Akron, Ohio area. From its classroom origins, the piano pop and guitar-styled group has graduated to national exposure.

=== 2006: Formation of The Strange Familiar ===
After Jaded Era disbanded, Kira and Jeff headed to the Leyden family basement, where they set up a studio and started writing songs that would become the foundation of The Strange Familiar. After months of performing around town and experimenting with new sounds, they recruited bass player, Frank Freeman, who had also parted ways with his band. The three of them made a bold move to Los Angeles where a combination of good fortune and hard work began opening doors for them. One of the good happenings was a meeting with producer/record label exec Brian Malouf who has worked with Everclear, Pearl Jam, and Michael Jackson. Brian went on to produce and mix their debut EP, helping the group to home in on their sound.

=== 2008: "You Can't Go Back" EP ===
The Strange Familiar independently released their first EP in 2008.

=== 2009: "This Is Gravity" ===
The Strange Familiar lift their resonant pop rock to new heights on their debut full length album, "This Is Gravity". The album was released independently on the band's own label, Paper Doll Records. It features seven new tracks and five songs from their self-released 2008 EP, "You Can’t Go Back", including singles "Secret Life (You & Me)" and "Courage Is..."

=== 2012: "Chasing Shadows" ===
The band signed a record deal with indie label, Krian Music Group, and released their first nationally distributed full-length album, "Chasing Shadows", on April 10, 2012.

== Appearances and performances ==
=== ABC Family ===
The band first gained national attention when their song "Courage Is...", from their self-released debut You Can't Go Back EP, was used in trailers and promotions for the new hit ABC Family series The Secret Life of the American Teenager in 2008. "Lyrically and tonally, the song couldn't have been more perfect for the show," says Stacy Asturias, creative director at ABC Family. "Plus, it's just a really beautiful song in its own right. We love to hear great new music, and so does our fan base." Without a label, their debut EP quickly reached the Top 10 on iTunes. ABC Family continued to feature The Strange Familiar and their songs "I Just Want To Love You" and "Secret Life (You and Me)" in promos for Season Two and Season Three of Secret Life. A music video for "Secret Life (You and Me)" was included as a bonus feature on season 2 DVD. The band also wrote and recorded an original Christmas single "The Only Gift I Need" for Walt Disney's compilation album Songs to Celebrate 25 Days of Christmas.

Since the 2012 release of their album Chasing Shadows, ABC Family has used their song "Redemption" in promos and trailers for Switched at Birth and their single "Unwanted" was featured in a season 3 episode of Pretty Little Liars.

=== America's Got Talent ===
The Strange Familiar appeared on the fifth season of America's Got Talent and reached the Top 48. They performed live on NBC in the quarter-finals to almost 10 million viewers.

=== Songs featured in film and television ===
- "Courage Is..." — Secret Life of the American Teenager Promos and Trailers (May 13, 2008 – August 31, 2010)
- "Secret Life (You and Me)" — Secret Life of the American Teenager Promos and Trailers (September 8, 2008 – March 24, 2009)
- "I Just Want To Love You" — Secret Life of the American Teenager Promos and Trailers (May 15, 2009 – July 1, 2010)
- "Courage Is..." — The Biggest Loser Season 7 Premiere (January 6, 2009)
- "Courage" — Stand Up to Cancer Orianthi version (September 10, 2010)
- "Still Have Time" — The 19th Wife (September 13, 2010)
- "I Just Want To Love You" — Degrassi "Umbrella" Part 1 (October 29, 2010)
- "Redemption" — Switched at Birth and Jane By Design Promos and Trailers (November 20, 2011)
- "Angel" — Brothers and Sisters (season 5) "Scandalized" (January 2, 2011)
- "Redemption" — The Vampire Diaries (season 3) "Heart of Darkness" (April 19, 2012)
- "Unwanted" — Pretty Little Liars (season 3) "Birds of a Feather" (June 26, 2012)
- "Alibi" — Pretty Little Liars (season 3) "Out of the frying pan, into the inferno" (January 29, 2013)
- "Redemption" — Pretty Little Liars (season 3) "What Becomes of the Broken-Hearted" (February 12, 2013)
- "Run Away Heart" — Pretty Little Liars (season 3) "I'm Your Puppet" (March 12, 2013)
- "Where I Belong" — The Glades (season 4) "Shot Girls" (June 3, 2013)
- "Shelter" — Pretty Little Liars (season 3) "Now You See Me, Now You Don't" (August 27, 2013)
- "Where I Belong" — Cedar Cove (TV series) "Old Flames, New Sparks" (September 14, 2013)

=== Songwriting ===
"Invisible" was written by Kira Leyden and Jeff Andrea and released as a single by Ashlee Simpson. It entered the U.S. Billboard Hot 100 chart at number twenty-eight, the week's highest debut and the highest debut of Simpson's career.

Orianthi recorded a version of The Strange Familiar's "Courage Is...". It was released as a single on August 31, 2010 by Geffen Records with the title "Courage" featuring Lacey Sturm from Flyleaf. The track was included on her re-release of "Believe (II)" and as a bonus track on Believe. It reached No. 37 on the Adult Top 40.

== Discography ==
=== Studio albums ===
Year	Album	Label
2008	You Can't Go Back EP	Independent Release (Paper Doll Records)
2009	This Is Gravity	Independent Release (Paper Doll Records)
2012	Chasing Shadows	Krian Music Group
2014	The Day the Light Went Out	Krian Music Group

=== Track listing ===
- You Can't Go Back EP (2008)
1. "Courage Is..."
2. "You Can't Go Back"
3. "Raise Your Glass"
4. "Gay Parade"
5. "Never Be"
- This Is Gravity (2009)
1. "Still Have Time"
2. "I Just Want To Love You"
3. "Courage Is..."
4. "This Is Gravity"
5. "Angel"
6. "Secret Life (You and Me)"
7. "Nobody's Hero"
8. "Witness"
9. "Raise Your Glass"
10. "You Can't Go Back"
11. "I Know Your Name"
12. "Never Be"
- Chasing Shadows (2012)
1. "Run Away Heart"
2. "Falling Back To You"
3. "Being Me"
4. "Shelter"
5. "Unwanted"
6. "Echoes"
7. "Brace For Impact"
8. "It's Easier To Walk Away"
9. "Redemption"
10. "Where I Belong"
11. "Alibi"
- "The Day the Light Went Out" (2014)
1. Painkiller
2. Gone
3. Rain
4. Surrender
5. Except to You
6. Lies
7. And I Wait
8. The One
9. We All Fall Down
10. The Day the Light Went Out

=== Other ===
- "ABC Family: Songs to Celebrate 25 Days of Christmas (2009)
1. "The Only Gift I Need"
