= I Am Me =

Studio album by Ashlee Simpson
- Released: October 18, 2005
- Recorded: May–August 2005
- Genre: Pop rock
- Length: 39:35
- Label: Geffen
- Producer: John Shanks

Ashlee Simpson chronology
Autobiography (2004)	I Am Me (2005)	Bittersweet World (2008)

Singles from I Am Me
- 1. "Boyfriend" Released: September 6, 2005; 2. "L.O.V.E." Released: December 6, 2005

I Am Me is the second studio album by American singer-songwriter Ashlee Simpson. It was released in the United States on October 18, 2005, and debuted at number one in sales. The album produced two top-25 hits on the Billboard Hot 100, "Boyfriend" and "L.O.V.E." Simpson worked with John Shanks and Kara DioGuardi on this album, as she did on her first album, 2004's Autobiography. Shanks produced the album, and Simpson co-wrote all the songs with Shanks and DioGuardi. On December 15, I Am Me was certified Platinum by the RIAA for its shipments of over one million copies in the U.S. As of April 2008, it had sold 987,000 copies. A new single from Simpson, "Invisible", was reportedly going to be included on a re-release of I Am Me in mid-2006, but was canceled. The song was later included as an international bonus track on Simpson's next album, Bittersweet World.

== Background and production ==
I Am Me was released about fifteen months after Autobiography, which was released in July 2004. According to Simpson, following her concert tour from February to April 2005, she was supposed to take a month off, but began working on the album early; as she said, "I got home and got bored, so I called John Shanks and was like, 'Can I come in the studio? Let's get a head start so the record company's not asking for the record right away or anything." She also said that she wanted to "get the pre-jitters or anything that was going wrong out of my system. And when I went in everything started going smooth. It was fun." According to Simpson, she felt less pressure when recording I Am Me than she did when recording Autobiography.

I Am Me is, like its predecessor, a mixture of rock and pop; it has been described as similar to Simpson's first album, and Simpson herself has said that she wanted it to be "familiar" to Autobiography. Some differences have also been noted. I Am Me has been said to be influenced by '80s music, and Simpson herself said "I just love '80s music" and "It's just so light and fun, and that was a lot of what I wanted to do on this record." Prior to recording I Am Me, Simpson had said she wanted to incorporate more of the feel of 17th century music into her next album, as some of her favorite music is from that time.

I Am Me has been called more musically "aggressive" than Autobiography and incorporates a range of musical styles; it has been called "dynamic" and "ambitious". Simpson's father and manager Joe said that his daughter had to be held back from "the places she wanted to go" as an artist, because, he said, if she changed too quickly her fans would be left behind. Simpson has mentioned how she tried "new sounds" when working on the album, citing in particular the song "Burnin Up", which was described by one reviewer as "a fairly credible stab at Clash-style dub". This song is not a cover of the early Madonna song ("Burning Up") that Simpson covered live during her February–April 2005 tour.

Lyrically, the album reflects Simpson's different life experiences since her last album; in particular, two songs deal with Simpson's emotions following her failed performance on Saturday Night Live in October 2004, in which she used a backing track due to illness, only to have the wrong track played, thus making the presence of the backing track obvious and embarrassing her on live television. This incident left Simpson the target of a great deal of criticism and humor at her expense. The first song on the album that deals with the incident is "Beautifully Broken", which strikes a positive tone of overcoming as Simpson finds beauty in failure—"the song is kind of about when you're in bed and you're crying and you don't want to get up the next day ... it's about finding that inner strength and finding that part in yourself that's like, 'Yes, I can put my head up and I can continue.'" "Catch Me When I Fall", the second song on the album dealing with the incident, is a piano-driven ballad which reflects weakness and sadness and deals with a feeling of loneliness. The theme of accepting imperfections is reflected in a hidden message that is included in the CD case. Simpson has said of the album: "The record is dark meets light in a sense. I feel everyone has a dark side. This album is about finding the positive, finding the lighter side as well." Simpson mentioned in an AIM interview online that she chose the title I Am Me "because I've been through a lot of highs and lows this year, but no matter what happens to me I always stay true to who I am." Simpson has also mentioned how the lyrics on the album reflect her different feelings at different times, the ups and downs she experienced: "We all get sad sometimes, and we all want to dance and party, too."

Like Autobiography, many of the songs deal with relationships. "Coming Back For More" is, as Simpson calls it, a "fun, dancey song about an ex-boyfriend" and their relationship that won't come to an end. "I Am Me" is an energetic song in which Simpson responds with hurt and anger to her boyfriend being with another girl, and insists: "I am me, and I won't change for anyone". "In Another Life" is, in Simpson's words, "a cute romantic song about when you meet a guy and it's kind of like he knows everything about you before you really get to know him, and you feel comfortable with him right away. And he makes you feel beautiful." "Say Goodbye", the melancholy album closer, deals with the ending of a relationship. Other songs cover a variety of topics: "Boyfriend" is a response to rumors or accusations that she stole another girl's boyfriend (although rumors suggest it is about her alleged affair with Lindsay Lohan's ex-boyfriend, Wilmer Valderrama, Simpson has said it is not about "one person in particular", but is instead about a situation many girls can relate to); "L.O.V.E." is about girls going out and having fun without needing any guys; "Eyes Wide Open" is a "spooky song" about Simpson's feeling that there was a ghost living in her house.

In 2009, Miley Cyrus covered the international bonus track "Kicking and Screaming" for her The Time of Our Lives EP. Although Simpson co-wrote the song with Shanks and DioGuardi, Simpson was not credited for her writing contribution on Cyrus' EP.

== Promotion ==
Initially, the first single was planned to be "L.O.V.E.", and the album was going to be titled In Another Life. Soon after these things were announced, however, the first single was changed to "Boyfriend" and the album title to I Am Me.

"Boyfriend" officially hit radio on September 6 and its airplay rapidly increased afterward; it debuted on the Hot 100 in September at number 71, rose greatly the next week to number 24, and eventually reached a Hot 100 peak of number 19, making it Simpson's second most successful song on the Hot 100 to date. The song's music video premiered on MTV's Making the Video on September 12.

"L.O.V.E." was the second single, as Simpson first said in an MSN Internet chat on October 26. Prior to its release as a single, "L.O.V.E." debuted on the Billboard Hot 100 at number 78 in late October, and re-entered at number 76 in December; it subsequently reached its peak at number 22. The "L.O.V.E." video also spent 10 total days at number one on MTV's video countdown show Total Request Live. "Catch Me When I Fall" charted on the Billboard Pop 100 at number 93 on the strength of its downloads, although it was not released as a single.

Simpson made several notable television appearances, including a return to Saturday Night Live on the night of October 8–9 (during which she performed "Catch Me When I Fall" and "Boyfriend"), to promote I Am Me and its singles. On the album's release date, October 18, Simpson performed "Boyfriend" and "Coming Back For More" on Good Morning America, and she appeared for an interview on Live with Regis and Kelly, although she did not perform. Later in the day she appeared on Total Request Live, where she performed "Boyfriend". She also sang "Boyfriend" on the October 21 episode of The Tonight Show and was on the October 22 episode of Larry King Live (guest-hosted by Ryan Seacrest) for an interview, along with her father/manager Joe. On the October 24 episode of The Ellen DeGeneres Show she sang "Boyfriend" and was interviewed; on November 1 she was in Canada to promote the album and appeared on MuchMusic's MuchOnDemand for an interview.

Simpson began promoting "L.O.V.E." with a performance on the Late Show with David Letterman on November 21, followed by a performance of the song on the November 22 episode of The View. On December 6, she sang "L.O.V.E." as part of a performance with Pretty Ricky at the Billboard Music Awards. Simpson sang "L.O.V.E." on the first episode of CD USA, which aired on January 21, 2006, and was also interviewed on the show.

Simpson went to the UK to promote I Am Me and "Boyfriend" in late January 2006; on February 5 she performed "Boyfriend" on Top of the Pops Reloaded. Later in February, in the U.S., Simpson was awarded with a "Bounce Back Award" at the TRL Awards, which aired on February 25, and performed "L.O.V.E." on the occasion. Simpson hosted the MTV Australia Video Music Awards on April 12, 2006, and performed both "Boyfriend" and "L.O.V.E."

Simpson performed the songs "Boyfriend", "L.O.V.E." and "I Am Me" for Sessions@AOL on the Internet prior to the album's release. The album was available for listening on MTV.com's "The Leak" in the week prior to its release, beginning October 11. Wal-Mart released an exclusive package which includes the I Am Me CD and a DVD.

According to a rumor initially reported in March 2006, there would be a re-release of I Am Me with at least one new song. It was subsequently stated in an article in the June/July 2006 issue of Teen People that there would be a re-release of the album with the new song "Invisible"; Simpson also said this in interviews, but as of January 2007, no release date for the re-release had been announced and therefore the re-release plans were presumably dropped. Simpson filmed the music video for "Invisible" in May, and it premiered on June 19.

=== Touring ===
To promote the album and single, Simpson began touring on September 21 in Portland, Oregon, with another stage of the tour starting on November 9 in Portland, Maine with opening act October Fall. During 2006 she performed on several dates in the spring; in early May she performed at SunFest in West Palm Beach, Florida. Subsequently, she embarked on a major summer tour, the L.O.V.E. Tour (with "L.O.V.E." being expanded to stand for "Love Others Value Everyday"), which began on June 5 in Santa Barbara, California and at its outset was scheduled to run for 32 shows, concluding on July 29 in Clarkston, Michigan. Ashley Parker Angel was an opening act for Simpson; The Veronicas also opened on the first few shows of the tour, but had to cancel their participation in the tour due to a problem with the vocal cords of one of the singers, Lisa Origliasso. During the concerts of this tour, Simpson had a number of costume changes, including a "risque" outfit for "La La", and performed a cover of the Eurythmics song "Sweet Dreams (Are Made of This)". She also performed a cover of "Why Don't You Do Right?".

== Critical reception ==
Professional ratings
Aggregate scores
Source	Rating
Metacritic	43/100
Review scores
Source	Rating
AllMusic	2/5 stars
Billboard	3.5/5 stars
Blender	2/5 stars
Entertainment Weekly	C−
The Guardian	2/5 stars
Los Angeles Times	1.5/4 stars
The New York Times	3.5/5 stars
Q	2/5 stars
Rolling Stone	1.5/5 stars
Slant Magazine	2.5/5 stars

Initial critical response to I Am Me was mixed to negative. At Metacritic, which assigns a normalized rating out of 100 to reviews from mainstream critics, the album has received an average score of 43, based on 13 reviews.

A BBC review of the album was positive, calling it "confident yet searching" and saying that it "flirts with 80s production throughout and produces a more mature, tighter sound than some of her peers." Stylus also gave it a favorable review; while saying that it "isn't as consistently strong a record as Autobiography", it calls I Am Me "more-than-respectable" and "a very good record". Another review called it "a solid pop/rock album" with strong songwriting that "should go far to re-establish Ashlee Simpson as a legitimate artist", giving it three-and-a-half stars (out of five).

Rolling Stone gave it a negative review, rating it slightly lower than it had previously rated Autobiography: I Am Me received one-and-a-half stars, while Autobiography received two (out of five). The Rolling Stone review called the album "a collection of eleven soulless tunes that fail to even qualify as guilty pleasures" and said that "in venturing to offer something for everyone, Simpson offers nothing for anyone." Allmusic also gave the album a negative assessment (and a rating of two stars out of five), saying that "unlike Autobiography, this simply is no rock & roll fun — the songs aren't catchy, the attitude is dour, the productions are cold and distant, all highlighting the deficiencies in Ashlee Simpson as a singer, while burying the likeable persona she had on both her debut and her MTV show." Blender said that, in comparison to Autobiography, "the songs are soggier, the sentiments more banal", and calls I Am Me a "sophomore slump", giving it two out of five stars.

Another review called the album "solid but unspectacular", crediting Simpson with going "in directions that Avril Lavigne has never thought of" but wishing that Simpson displayed more "obnoxious grit" on the album.

== Commercial performance ==
I Am Me debuted at number one on the Billboard 200, as did its predecessor, Autobiography; however, I Am Me did not achieve the same level of success as Autobiography. Whereas Simpson's first album sold 398,000 copies its first week of release in the U.S., I Am Me sold only about 220,000, according to Billboard; sales for the album declined 67% in its second week, when it sold about 73,000 copies and fell to number six on the Billboard 200. In its third week, the album sold about 54,000 copies, a sales drop of 25%, and it fell on the chart to number ten. Rolling Stone magazine grouped it among the numerous "heavily anticipated albums" of the season whose sales had "fizzled", such as Alicia Keys' Unplugged and Rod Stewart's Thanks for the Memory: The Great American Songbook 4, which had been released the same week as I Am Me. As of April 2008, I Am Me has sold 944,000 copies in the U.S., according to Nielsen SoundScan.

In Australia, I Am Me debuted at number 35 without a single being lifted from it before its release. "Boyfriend" was released the week after I Am Me was released. However, I Am Me failed to chart again after its debut and dropped out completely.

In the United Kingdom, in the absence of any promotion, I Am Me debuted at #160, selling just 1,392 copies in its first week. However, in late January 2006, Simpson went to the UK to promote "Boyfriend", several months later than in the U.S.; the single was released in the UK on 30 January 2006, and hit #12 in its first week; also, the album climbed to #50 in the UK in mid-February 2006.

== Track listing ==
All tracks are written by Ashlee Simpson, Kara DioGuardi and John Shanks.

No.	Title	Length
1.	"Boyfriend"	2:59
2.	"In Another Life"	3:48
3.	"Beautifully Broken"	3:16
4.	"L.O.V.E."	2:33
5.	"Coming Back for More"	3:29
6.	"Dancing Alone"	3:56
7.	"Burnin Up"	3:54
8.	"Catch Me When I Fall"	4:00
9.	"I Am Me"	3:16
10.	"Eyes Wide Open"	4:10
11.	"Say Goodbye"	4:15
Total length:		39:36

International bonus track
No.	Title	Length
12.	"Kicking and Screaming"	2:58
Total length:		42:34

20th anniversary deluxe edition
No.	Title	Length
13.	"Invisible"	3:45
Total length:		46:19

UK bonus track
No.	Title	Length
13.	"Fall in Love with Me"	2:59
Total length:		45:33

Japanese bonus tracks
No.	Title	Length
14.	"Get Nasty"	3:16
15.	"Boyfriend" (video enhanced)	3:17
Total length:		52:06

Taiwan limited edition bonus VCD
No.	Title	Length
1.	"Boyfriend" (music video)	3:17
2.	"L.O.V.E." (music video)	2:40
Total length:		5:57

DVD version
No.	Title	Length
1.	"Walmart Exclusive" (in-store exclusive performance ("Nothing New" & "Pieces of Me") followed by question & answer session)
2.	"Autobiography" (live) (from AOL Music Live!)
3.	"La La" (live) (from AOL Music Live!)
4.	"Shadow" (music video)
5.	"Pieces of Me" (music video)

== Personnel ==
Adapted from the I Am Me liner notes.

=== Musicians ===
- Ashlee Simpson – vocals, background vocals (4, 7)
- John Shanks – guitars (all tracks), bass (1, 2, 3, 6, 7, 9, 10, 12, 13 and 14), keyboards (1, 2, 4–14), piano (3), background vocals (2, 3, 7, 9 and 11)
- Kara DioGuardi – background vocals (4 and 7)
- Jeff Rothschild – drums (all tracks)
- Dan Chase – additional keyboards (1, 2, 5, 7, 12, 13 and 14)
- Patrick Warren – keyboards (3 and 8)
- André Bowman – bass, keyboards (4)
- Mike Elizondo – bass (4, 5 and 8)
- Paul Bushnell – bass (11)

=== Production ===
- John Shanks – producer, mixing
- Jordan Schur – executive producer, A&R
- Joe Simpson – executive producer
- Jeff Rothschild – mixing, engineering
- Ted Jensen – mastering
- James White – photography
- Bubbles – design
- Jessica Paster – stylist
- Ken Paves – hair
- AYAKO – make-up

== Charts ==
=== Weekly charts ===
Chart (2005)	Peak position
Australian Albums (ARIA)	35
Austrian Albums (Ö3 Austria)	60
Canadian Albums (Billboard)	4
Japanese Albums (Oricon)	13
Scottish Albums (Official Charts)	41
Taiwanese Albums (Five Music)	6
UK Albums (Official Charts)	50
US Billboard 200	1

=== Year-end charts ===
Chart (2005)	Position
US Billboard 200	171
Chart (2006)	Position
US Billboard 200	126

== Certifications ==
Region	Certification	Certified units/sales
Canada (Music Canada)	Gold	40,000^{^}
South Korea (GAON)	—	2,063
United States (RIAA)	Platinum	1,000,000^{^}
^{^} Shipments figures based on certification alone.

== Release history ==
Release dates and formats for I Am Me
Region	Date	Format	Label	Ref.
Canada	October 18, 2005	CD	Universal	
United States	October 18, 2005	CD	Geffen	
Japan	October 19, 2005	CD	Universal	
Australia	October 30, 2005	CD	Universal	
United Kingdom	October 31, 2005	CD	Universal	
Germany	April 21, 2006	CD	Universal	
Japan	September 27, 2006	CD	Universal	
