= Outta My Head (Ay Ya Ya) =

2007 single by Ashlee Simpson

Single by Ashlee Simpson

from the album Bittersweet World
- B-side: "Catch Me When I Fall"; "Rule Breaker"
- Released: December 11, 2007
- Recorded: 2007
- Studio: Hollywood, California (Chalice Studios, Record Plant Studios)
- Genre: Synthpop; new wave
- Length: 3:30; 3:37 (new intro)
- Label: Geffen
- Songwriters: Ashlee Simpson; King Logan; Dashawn "Happie" White; Jerome Harmon; Santi White; Kenna
- Producers: Timbaland; King Logan; Jerome Harmon; Jim Beanz

Ashlee Simpson singles chronology
"Invisible" (2006)	"Outta My Head (Ay Ya Ya)" (2007)	"Little Miss Obsessive" (2008)

Alternative cover

"Outta My Head (Ay Ya Ya)" is a song recorded by American singer Ashlee Simpson for her third studio album, Bittersweet World (2008). The song premiered on AOL Music on November 30, 2007 and was released for digital download on December 11.

== Background and composition ==
The song was first mentioned in a September 2007 MTV News article describing a sneak peek of Simpson's album; the article gave its title as "Ay Ay Ay". Simpson's father Joe Simpson joked that the song was about her mother Tina, while Tina replied that the song was also about Joe; Simpson herself said that it was "not about my mom. I just have too many voices in my head, everyone having their own opinion."

On November 13, 2007, Simpson told MTV News at CosmoGIRL!'s Born to Lead Awards that the album was completed and that it would be released in March 2008, with its first single, "Outta My Head (Ay Ya Ya)", to be released in January. She described "Outta My Head (Ay Ya Ya)" as a "fun, dancey song" with "a little bit of an '80s feel" and said that it was about all of the people in her life. She said that the video would be filmed in December. In December, speaking about the song, she referred to the need to "have your own creativity and place" away from others and how those other voices and opinions can lead to a feeling of frustration: "At the end of the day you're like 'Ahhh! Everybody stop!'".

== Reception ==
=== Critical reception ===
Reviews of the single were mostly positive. In their review of the song, Billboard noted that it was a "fun little romp, but ['Outta My Head'] may have difficulty returning Simpson to top 40 favor". Entertainment Weekly's Simon Vozick-Levinson noted that although the song's "beat [was] catchy enough...her vocals are sorta grating". In its Bittersweet World review, Rolling Stone said that the song "channels Missing Persons", while the Houston Chronicle said in its album review that "Outta My Head" "has the same synth claps and skulking groove of Madonna's "Burning Up" and a booming, Devo-esque chorus." The New York Daily News, reviewing the album, said that "you won't be able to get a song like 'Outta My Head' outta yours". The Washington Post was more critical, describing the song as "an attempt at '80s synth-pop that winds up cribbing its melody from Men at Work".

=== Chart performance ===
"Outta My Head (Ay Ya Ya)" failed to impact radio in the U.S. upon its release. It has sold about 117,000 digital downloads as of mid-March 2008, and it reached number 21 on the Bubbling Under Billboard Hot 100 chart, failing to chart on the Billboard Hot 100. "Outta My Head (Ay Ya Ya)" is the only single from Simpson that did not join in the Billboard Hot 100. On the Australian ARIA Singles Chart, "Outta My Head" debuted at number 30 and then rose to number sixteen in its second week in based solely on downloads. It then dropped to No. 22, then No. 31 in its fourth week only on downloads. In its fifth week it rose up to No. 22 and stayed in top thirty for over four weeks, due to its CD single release. The video was named as cable music station Channel V's "Ripe Clip of The Week". "Outta My Head (Ay Ya Ya)" is Simpson's first single in the United Kingdom since "Boyfriend" in early 2006. It was released to UK music channels on April 1, and received extensive airplay on most music channels, but received no Radio Airplay. It reached No. 1 on Box Breakers on The Box. On April 27, "Outta My Head" entered the UK Singles Chart at No. 34 on downloads alone; it then climbed to No. 24 in following weeks. So far "Outta My Head" has sold over 25,000 copies in the UK since April. "Outta My Head" was still in UK Singles Chart over 2 months after its official release. "Outta My Head" entered the Irish Singles Chart at No. 20 on downloads alone. It peaked at No. 15 after physical release, giving Simpson her fourth Top 20 hit in Ireland.

== Track listing ==
All tracks are written by Ashlee Simpson, King Logan, Dashawn "Happie" White, Jerome Harmon, Santi White, Kenna, except where noted.

Digital download single
No.	Title	Length
1.	"Outta My Head (Ay Ya Ya)"	3:30

Digital download EP
No.	Title	Writer(s)	Length
1.	"Outta My Head (Ay Ya Ya)" (New Intro)		3:37
2.	"Rule Breaker"	Simpson; Logan; Harmon; Jim Beanz	3:21
3.	"Catch Me When I Fall"	Simpson; Kara DioGuardi; John Shanks	4:00

CD single
No.	Title	Writer(s)	Length
1.	"Outta My Head (Ay Ya Ya)" (New Intro)		3:37
2.	"L.O.V.E." (Missy Underground Mix featuring Missy Elliott)	Simpson; DioGuardi; Shanks	3:26

Maxi CD single
No.	Title	Length
1.	"Outta My Head (Ay Ya Ya)" (New Intro)	3:37
2.	"Outta My Head (Ay Ya Ya)" (Dave Audé Remix)	4:06
3.	"Outta My Head (Ay Ya Ya)" (DJ AM / Eli Escobar Remix)	6:13
4.	"Outta My Head (Ay Ya Ya)" (video)

== Music video ==
=== Background and release ===
Directed by Alan Ferguson, Simpson filmed the music video for the song over about 48 hours on December 6– 7. The desert scenes were filmed on the first day in Acton, California, while the indoor straitjacket scene was filmed on the second day in Burbank, California. Kenna, a co-writer of the song, played a reporter in the video. In an interview with Billboard, she described the video as having surrealist influences, mentioning Salvador Dalí and Being John Malkovich. Her boyfriend (now ex-husband) Pete Wentz described it as "probably the weirdest video I've seen of hers" and said that it, like the song, "has this kind of multiple personality". The video for the single premiered on December 19, and Simpson appeared on the December 20 episode of MTV's Total Request Live for the video's premiere on the show. Simpson described the video as being "ambitious" and "like an art piece" and said that it involves going into "another world and never know[ing] what's real". The "Outta My Head" music video had been streamed over two million times as of March 2008. By early September, the video had been viewed more than five million times on YouTube. As of July 2009 the video has been streamed over six and a half million times, making the video her most watched video on the social network YouTube.

=== Synopsis ===
The video begins with Simpson lying on a couch in therapy; her therapist, apparently based on Sigmund Freud, has fallen asleep. Soon the walls of the office melt away into a surreal desert landscape (including a Dalí-esque melting clock), where another, dark-haired version of Simpson sits atop a floating Rubik's Cube and the giant head of a statue in Simpson's likeness lies on the ground. There are also frequent flashes of Simpson on the couch in therapy again, this time in the desert rather than the office. Simpson is pursued by people but trips and falls to the ground. Afterwards she listens to a recording and begins singing along, but soon she is surrounded by interviewers, photographers (one of them having a camera for a head), and autograph-seekers, and she faints. When she awakes, she finds she has been tied up by tiny people; when she breaks free, she again awakes, this time in a bedroom. The bedroom wall is rolled away to reveal a studio set where another version of Simpson is singing and dancing. As the real Simpson watches from her bed, where an interviewer appears and begins asking her questions, the robot Simpson eventually malfunctions and begins to explode, falling to the ground. Simpson tries to escape from this scene, fighting off interviewers and cameramen, but is captured by doctors from a mental institution and taken away in an ambulance. In her room, Simpson, now in a straitjacket, finds herself again surrounded by interviewers and cameramen; this time she bounces off the walls and spins around in the air as the video ends.

== Charts ==
Chart (2008)	Peak position
Australia (ARIA)	16
Austria (Ö3 Austria Top 40)	71
Canada Hot 100 (Billboard)	59
European Hot 100 Singles	37
Germany (Media Control AG)	30
Ireland (IRMA)	15
Russia (2M)	146
Scottish Singles Sales (Official Charts)	12
UK Singles (Official Charts)	24
US Bubbling Under Hot 100 Singles (Billboard)	21

== Release history ==
Release dates and formats for "Outta My Head (Ay Ya Ya)"
Region	Date	Format	Label	Ref.
United States	December 11, 2007	Digital download	Geffen	
United States	February 5, 2008	Digital download	Geffen	
United States	February 12, 2008	CD single; digital download	Geffen	
Australia	March 15, 2008	CD single	Universal	
United Kingdom	May 12, 2008	CD single	Polydor	
Germany	May 16, 2008	CD single	Universal	
