= Little Miss Obsessive =

Single by Ashlee Simpson

from the album Bittersweet World
- Released: March 11, 2008
- Recorded: Archon Studios (Los Angeles, California), Chalice Studios (Hollywood, California)
- Genre: Pop rock; alternative rock
- Length: 3:42
- Label: Geffen; Interscope
- Songwriters: Ashlee Simpson; Jim Beanz; Victor Valentine; Big Karl Berringer; Jesse Welch
- Producers: Jack Joseph Puig; Big Karl Berringer; Jim Beanz

Ashlee Simpson singles chronology
"Outta My Head (Ay Ya Ya)" (2007)	"Little Miss Obsessive" (2008)

"Little Miss Obsessive" is a song recorded by American singer Ashlee Simpson for her third studio album, Bittersweet World (2008). It features uncredited guest vocals from Tom Higginson, the lead singer of the Plain White T's. The song was written by Simpson, Jim Beanz, Victor Valentine and Big Karl Berringer. "Little Miss Obsessive" was produced by Jack Joseph Puig and Big Karl Berringer, with vocal production by Beanz. The song was released as the "first official single" from Bittersweet World on March 11, 2008, following the commercial disappointment of its predecessor, "Outta My Head (Ay Ya Ya)".

"Little Miss Obsessive" is a pop rock power ballad that chronicles the "ostensibly aural dance" of a couple "who break up to make up – and like it". Simpson looked to herself for inspiration when writing the song. Music critics were divided on "Little Miss Obsessive"; some critics felt the song was impressive, while others were critical of Simpson's vocals and the song's lyrics. The song only managed to chart on the national charts of Canada and the United States, where it peaked at 72 and 96, respectively.

== Writing and production ==
"Little Miss Obsessive" was written by Ashlee Simpson, Jim Beanz, Victor Valentine and Karl Berringer. The song was produced by Jack Joseph Puig and Berringer. Simpson's vocals, which were produced by Beanz, were recorded at Archon Studios in Los Angeles and at Chalice Studios in Hollywood by Aris Achontis and Tal Herzberg, respectively. Tom Higginson, the lead singer of the Plain White T's, performed guest vocals in the song, as well as background vocals alongside Simpson and Mateo Laboriel, who also provided programming for the song. The guitar was played by Ray Brady, while Joey Kamani played the bass guitar and Abe Laboriel Jr played the drums in the song. Dean Nelson engineered the song, while Puig mixed the song at Ocean Way Recording in Hollywood.

Simpson looked to herself for inspiration when writing "Little Miss Obsessive", which chronicles the "ostensibly aural dance" of a couple "who break up to make up – and like it". Of the song's concept, Simpson commented: "It's what we can all become in a relationship sometimes. We put our foot in our mouths and we wish we didn't — 'No, I didn't mean to say it. I take it back. I take it back.'" According to Simpson, the song "kind of relates to the last album [I Am Me], but it grew with the new record. And every girl has gone through that situation. You put your foot in your mouth and you go, 'Wait, why did I do that?' We're on our phones writing and texting too much!"

== Composition and critical response ==
"Little Miss Obsessive" is a pop rock power ballad, with a duration of three minutes and forty-two seconds (3:42). The song features "crashing" guitars, "drum thuds", "confused Avril-style rants" and a "swelling chorus". "Little Miss Obsessive" begins with a mid-tempo piano line, before transcending into a "more rollicking" chorus, which sees Simpson sing: "Little miss obsessive, can't get over it". Lyrically, Simpson laments about a breakup with the "youthful fervor of a late-night text message".

Sophie Bruce of BBC Music wrote that the song is the "standout success" of Bittersweet World and that is "deserves to take Ashlee to the forefront of female pop". Entertainment Weekly's Leah Greenblatt called "Little Miss Obsessive" a "well-wrought breakup anthem". Jennifer Cady of E! Online cited the song as sounding "more like her older stuff" and wrote that it will probably be "more attractive to radio stations", than "Outta My Head (Ay Ya Ya)", the first single from Bittersweet World. Nick Levine of Digital Spy called "Little Miss Obsessive" a "decent enough tune, not a million miles away from 'Pieces of Me', but we can't see it reviving the album's fortunes".

Alex Fletcher of Digital Spy wrote that despite a "surging power-pop chorus", "Little Miss Obsessive" lacks "the wow factor" required to "get people talking about Simpson's music again". Glenn Gamboa of Newsday called "Little Miss Obsessive" a "passable Pinkish pop" song, but stated that it isn't enough to keep Bittersweet World from "going sour". Nick Levine of Digital Spy wrote that Simpson's voice is "insufficiently meaty" to be able to sing the song. Stephen Thomas Erlewine of AllMusic called the song "quite awful", writing that exploring "the endless possibilities of the word 'over' in the chorus" is "a bit of a slog".

== Release and promotion ==
Simpson premiered "Little Miss Obsessive" on the KISS FM DreX Morning Show in Chicago on February 21. The song was later announced to be the "first official single" from Simpson's third studio album Bittersweet World. It was speculated that the song was labelled as the album's "first official single" because "Outta My Head (Ay Ya Ya)", had performed below expectations. The song was released for digital download in the United States on March 11, 2008. It was sent to mainstream radio in the United States on March 18, 2008. Simpson performed "Little Miss Obsessive" for the first time on MTV's Total Request Live on April 15, for the episode that aired on April 17. She also performed it on The Today Show on April 18. "Little Miss Obsessive" was released in the United Kingdom on August 4, 2008.

== Charts ==
Chart (2008)	Peak position
Canada Hot 100 (Billboard)	72
US Billboard Hot 100	96
US Dance Club Songs (Billboard)	12

== Credits and personnel ==
Credits adapted from the liner notes of Bittersweet World.

Locations

- Vocals recorded at Archon Studios, Los Angeles, California and Chalice Studios, Hollywood, California
- Mixed at Ocean Way Recording, Hollywood, California

Personnel

- Ashlee Simpson – background vocals, songwriter
- Jim Beanz – songwriter, vocal producer
- Victor Valentine – songwriter
- Karl Berringer – producer, songwriter
- Jack Joseph Puig – producer, mixer
- Tom Higginson – background vocals, guest vocals
- Mateo Laboriel – background vocals, programming
- Ray Brady – guitar
- Joey Kamani – bass guitar
- Abe Laboriel Jr – drums
- Dean Nelson – engineer
- Aris Achontis – vocal engineer
- Tal Herzberg – vocal engineer

== Release history ==
Release dates and formats for "Little Miss Obsessive"
Region	Date	Format	Label	Ref.
United States	March 11, 2008	Digital download	Geffen	
United States	March 18, 2008	Contemporary hit radio	Geffen	
United Kingdom	August 4, 2008	Contemporary hit radio	Polydor	
