= Invisible (Jaded Era song) =

2003 song by Jaded Era

Single by Jaded Era

from the album Invisible
- Released: 2003 (U.S.)
- Label: Catch 'em
- Songwriters: Kira Leyden; Jeff Andrea; Marco Hilj; Eric Ortopan
- Producer: Tim Patalan

"Invisible" is a song written by Kira Leyden and Jeff Andrea, members of the Ohio-based unsigned band Jaded Era, and recorded for the band's second album, Invisible (2003). It was covered by American singer Ashlee Simpson for the re-release of her second album, I Am Me, and was released as the album's third single in 2006.

Andrea wrote the song's riff when he was seventeen years old and recorded it on a cassette tape, while Leyden said she wrote its lyrics on her hands during a lonely day at college; after completing the song together, they commented "There was always something special about it". Leyden has frequently said "everyone has felt completely invisible once in their lifetime, and sometimes it's just you against the world", and that the song's lyrics paralleled the band's status as independent and unsigned. Leyden and Andrea have also called it "the cornerstone for this band and where we come from", and it was produced by Tim Patalan.

The music video for Jaded Era's version of "Invisible" was directed by Dave Greene and members of the band, and produced on a US$300 budget. It comprises footage of the band performing the song intercut with black-and-white clips of a homeless man, a bullied school student, a hitch-hiker and a drug addict.

== Personnel ==
- Lead vocals, guitar and keys by Kira Leyden
- Lead guitar and additional vocals by Jeff Andrea
- Bass by Marco Hilj
- Drums by Eric Ortopan

== Ashlee Simpson version ==
"Invisible"

Single by Ashlee Simpson

from the album I Am Me (Note: on the 20th Anniversary Deluxe Edition)
- Released: June 6, 2006
- Recorded: March 2006
- Studio: Record Plant, Hollywood, California
- Genre: Rock
- Length: 3:45
- Label: Geffen
- Songwriters: Kira Leyden; Jeff Andrea; Marco Hilj; Eric Ortopan
- Producer: Ron Fair

Ashlee Simpson singles chronology
"L.O.V.E." (2005)	"Invisible" (2006)	"Outta My Head (Ay Ya Ya)" (2007)

Audio sample
- file; help

"Invisible" was covered by Ashlee Simpson and released as a single in the summer of 2006; it is the first single by Simpson that she did not co-write. Although it was said that the song would be included on a re-released version of Simpson's second album I Am Me, it appears as a bonus track on some editions of her third album, Bittersweet World, and on the 20th anniversary deluxe edition of I Am Me.

=== Background ===
In an interview Simpson stated that the song was mainly about having emotional strength and how she has learned from previous experiences (the Saturday Night Live and Orange Bowl incidents) to pick her pieces up from the floor and keep her head held up; according to her, "Invisible" reflects those moments, where she has had to pick herself up completely in order to succeed. "It's basically about life, about finding the courage to get back up and keep fighting, which I think everybody deals with every day", Simpson has said of the song. In a video of part of the process of recording the song, in which she is seen working with Ron Fair, Fair described how he approached Simpson with the song, which he thought would be a "perfect fit" for her; he had, Simpson said, had the song for about two years and chose her to record it. Fair said that although Simpson is a songwriter herself, even many great artists have performed songs written by others.

"Invisible" first appeared in April 2006 as a sample on Simpson's official website, and the June/July 2006 issue of Teen People mentioned in an article on Simpson that "Invisible" would be included on a re-released version of her album I Am Me. Simpson's version of "Invisible" has a few lyrical differences from the Jaded Era version: the line "but maybe you're not lost at all" was changed to "when maybe", and "they will see you" was used instead of "they won't see you".

=== Release ===
"Invisible" was released for digital download in July 2006, weeks after the official radio release. It entered the U.S. Billboard Hot 100 chart at number twenty-eight, the week's highest debut and the highest debut of Simpson's career. A week later it rose to number 21.

"Invisible" was included as the fifth track on the compilation album Nickelodeon's Kids' Choice, Vol. 3, released in February 2007. It was also featured as the sixteenth track on the Bratz Motion Picture Soundtrack, which was released on July 31, 2007. It was released physically and officially for the first time as a bonus track on most editions (not US) on her new album "Bittersweet World".

In 2026, it was included as a bonus track on the 20th Anniversary Deluxe Edition of I Am Me on digital and vinyl.

=== Music video ===
Simpson in a scene from the "Invisible" music video

The music video for "Invisible" features Simpson boxing, with scenes that were inspired by the 2004 film Million Dollar Baby and were shot in the same set as the film. The video was directed by Marc Webb, who also directed Simpson's video for "Boyfriend" (2005), and was filmed on May 23 and May 24, 2006, in Los Angeles, California. Simpson had to train for the video's boxing. The video is in black-and-white, which Simpson said was because it gave the video a "gritty, raw feel"; Webb referred to black-and-white as giving the video a "mythical quality". In the video, Simpson is initially knocked down by her opponent, but she sees a little girl in the crowd (who is colorized, unlike anything else in the video) who inspires her to get up again and win the fight; Simpson said that she can relate to this because her fans have stood by her in the same way.

The video showcased a new look for Simpson, with longer hair than in her previous music videos from I Am Me, as well as featuring what was said to be a slimmer nose due to the nose job she was reported to have had done in the month before the video was filmed.

The video was given a "Sneak Peek" on MTV's Total Request Live on June 2, and premiered on June 19; an episode of Making the Video about its filming also aired on that day. The video debuted on the TRL countdown on June 20 at number eight (her highest debut to date); it reached number one on its fifteenth day on the countdown, July 20, making it Simpson's fourth video to reach the top on TRL. During this period it was nominated for a 2006 MTV Video Music Award for "Best Cinematography". The video was on the countdown for the last time on August 23, subsequently falling off after 33 days.

=== Charts ===
Chart (2006)	Peak position
US Billboard Hot 100	21

=== Release history ===
Release dates and formats for "Invisible"
Region	Date	Format	Label	Ref.
United States	June 6, 2006	Contemporary hit radio	Geffen	
United States	July 18, 2006	Digital download	Geffen	
