= Jaded Era =

American alternative rock and pop band

- Origin: Cuyahoga Falls and Akron, Ohio United States
- Genres: Alternative rock, pop
- Years active: c. 1996–2006
- Label: Cage'em Records
- Members: Kira Leyden, Jeff Andrea, Marco Hilj, Eric Ortopan
- Website: jadedera.com

Jaded Era is an American alternative rock/pop band from Cuyahoga Falls and Akron, Ohio that formed around 1996 and later had their music released through Cage'em Records. They released their debut album Laugh at the World in 2001, and the albums Invisible and Study of the Human Race followed in 2003 and 2005, respectively. They first received significant attention in 2006 when pop rock singer-songwriter Ashlee Simpson covered "Invisible", the title track from Invisible. On the band's MySpace page, they cite The Kinks, No Doubt, Pearl Jam, The Pretenders, Queen and U2 as their influences.

== Band members ==
- Kira Leyden – lead vocals, guitar, keyboards
- Jeff Andrea – lead guitar, vocals
- Marco Hilj – bass guitar
- Eric Ortopan – drums

== Discography ==
Studio albums
| Title | Album details |
|---|---|
| Laugh at the World | Released: March 22, 2001; Label: Cage'em Records; Formats: Digital download, CD |
| Invisible | Released: March 2003; Label: Cage'em Records; Formats: Digital download, CD |
| Study of the Human Race | Released: July 2004; Label: Cage'em Records; Formats: Digital download, CD |
