= La La (Ashlee Simpson song) =

2004 single by Ashlee Simpson

Single by Ashlee Simpson

from the album Autobiography
- B-side: "Endless Summer"
- Released: November 8, 2004
- Genre: Rock; pop punk
- Length: 3:42
- Label: Polydor; Geffen
- Songwriters: Ashlee Simpson: Kara DioGuardi; John Shanks
- Producer: John Shanks

Ashlee Simpson singles chronology
"Shadow" (2004)	"La La" (2004)	"Boyfriend" (2005)

Audio sample
- file; help

"La La" is a song by American singer Ashlee Simpson from her debut album, Autobiography (2004). Two weeks after it became available as a digital download in mid-August 2004, it rose to No. 37 on Billboard's Hot Digital Tracks. In the United States, it began its run as the album's third and final single on radio and television in November 2004; in the United Kingdom, where it was the second single, a CD single was released in January 2005. The song's video was in heavy rotation on MTV by December 2004. In March 2005 the single was certified Gold, and in August the video was nominated for Best Pop Video on the MTV Video Music Awards.

Simpson performed "La La" multiple times on television in 2004. On January 4, 2005, Simpson performed the song live at the halftime show of the Orange Bowl football game in Miami, Florida. She sang off-key, and after singing the last line, the stadium audience booed her. Critics compared this poor performance to Simpson's revealing miscue on Saturday Night Live October 23, 2004, in which she had intended to perform "Autobiography" but the earlier recording of "Pieces of Me" was heard instead, showing that Simpson had been lip-syncing. Simpson explained the poor performance of "La La" was the result of an equipment failure, with her in-ear monitors not working.

== Song information ==
"La La", the fourth track on Autobiography, was written by Ashlee Simpson, Kara DioGuardi, and John Shanks, the producer of the album. Jeff Rothschild played drums on the track, Shanks played guitars and bass, and Simpson and DioGuardi did background vocals. The track is three minutes and 42 seconds long.

The song was not initially planned as the album's third single. In October 2004 it was announced that its title track, "Autobiography", would be the third single; however, on October 29, it was announced on Simpson's official website that "Autobiography" would be replaced as the third single by "La La", following Simpson's Saturday Night Live incident.

Following its release as a single in the UK on January 24, 2005, "La La" debuted at number 11 before falling; it spent four weeks in the top 40. In Ireland, it debuted at number 18 on that country's chart in late January and stayed there in the next week. In February, the song debuted at number 10 on the Australian singles chart (where it stayed for four weeks) and at number 98 on the Billboard Hot 100 in the US, where it eventually rose to number 86; by comparison, Simpson's first single, "Pieces of Me", had reached number 5 on the Hot 100 a few months earlier, and her second single, "Shadow", had reached number 57. Despite this relatively low chart peak, "La La" was credited with helping boost the sales of Autobiography, which rose on the charts from number 42 to number 33 (with a 61% sales increase) in one week in December 2004, soon after the single's debut. The single was certified gold by the Recording Industry Association of America (RIAA) in late March 2005; in Australia, it was also accredited as a gold single.

"La La" was used as the backing music for a ThermaSilk shampoo commercial. It was also covered in the rhythm-based 2006 Nintendo DS game Elite Beat Agents.

== Description ==
"La La" is the most rock-oriented track on Autobiography, and was described in a BBC review of the album as "energetic". Another review called it a "punk inspired, fast beat, screaming anthem". Reactions to the song have been mixed, however: People magazine called the song "insipid" in its review of the album, and AllMusic said that Simpson was "trying way too hard to be sexy." Rolling Stone said the song casts Simpson "as a barely legal temptress", and said "ironic or not, it's creepy." Billboard was more positive, saying that "La La" (in which it said Simpson was a "frisky bad girl") was one of the songs that could "keep Autobiography on the charts in the foreseeable future." The abovementioned BBC review named the song as one of those on the album that it regarded positively, and another review said Simpson "summons a credible pop-punk sound" on "La La".

The lyrics to the song are quite sexual, with "la la" being used as a euphemism for sex and a reference to Simpson dressing up as a French maid included; however, Simpson has described the lyrics as tongue-in-cheek: "It was one of those songs where every silly thing that was sexual that I could think of I put into the song."

In one interview, Simpson said of the song:

Another song, 'La La' is flirty and very sexy. It's very tongue in cheek; it can be interpreted in all different ways. It's about sexual fantasies. There's a lot of sarcasm in that song. It's something every girl thinks about, so I decided to make a joke about it. It's one of the songs you can dance around to. Actually, I wrote it because I was singing la la and it was kind of a little dance that I was doing around the room. I didn't have a song on my record that was like sexy. So I thought, I'm a girl and I'm feminine and I can be sexy, so here it goes."

== Music video and television performances ==
Performances of "La La" featured twice in the first season of The Ashlee Simpson Show, Simpson's reality show, which aired in the US on MTV from mid-June to early August 2004: she performed the song during her first live show in episode six, and again at the end of episode seven.

The music video for "La La", directed by Joseph Kahn and edited by David Blackburn was filmed over two days, November 11–12, 2004. It debuted on AOL's "First View" on November 22 and on MTV's Making the Video on November 23; the making of the video was also featured in episode three of the second season of The Ashlee Simpson Show, which aired in February 2005. Following the video's premiere, "La La" debuted at number ten on the TRL countdown on December 1, 2004; it subsequently reached number six, its peak, on its third day on the countdown. It remained on the countdown for nine days.

The video takes place in a suburban setting and was filmed in Huntington Beach, California. Simpson is seen singing the song, dancing on top of a car, in front of a donut shop, and laying on a couch playing Tony Hawk's Pro Skater 3 and Tony Hawk's Pro Skater 4 on Xbox, all during daylight. The video continues with a raucous late-night party around a swimming pool, which gets broken up by the police, and then Simpson and the crowd head to a laundromat, where the wild partying continues. Simpson's two best friends, Lauren and Stephanie, appear alongside her in the video. Simpson compared the video to the 1982 movie Fast Times at Ridgemont High. On The Ashlee Simpson Show, during the filming of the video there is a scene in which Simpson licks a couch cushion (while rolling around on it for sexual imagery), but, as she explains, it was taken out of the video because it was "a little much".

Simpson promoted the song with a number of television performances in December 2004 and January 2005 (see list below), with several UK performances in January. One of her US performances, at the Orange Bowl football game halftime show in early January (her first time performing in a stadium), was memorable for the harsh reception the song received from the audience, with "a discernible chorus of boos" after she finished singing, according to the Associated Press. Simpson was the last of three performances during the halftime show, and she later said that there were technical problems and that she couldn't hear herself properly, making the performance more difficult for her. The cause of the booing she received has been variously attributed to a backlash against her because of her SNL incident the previous October, to the poor quality of her singing, and to the fact that the crowd was generally not in the same age bracket as her usual fans. Simpson herself said "maybe they were booing at me, maybe they were booing at the halftime show 'cause the whole thing sucked," and also said that it may have been because of the team she was supporting; "I can't make everybody happy," she said. Simpson also had to change the lyrics to "La La" because of concern that they were too sexual for the show; for instance, a reference to "lemonade" replaced "French maid".

In April 2005, New Zealand's children TV Show "What Now?" held a weekly music video poll with the song "La La" being one of the three candidates. The song was competing against "1, 2 Step" by Ciara and Missy Elliott and "Let Me Love You" by Mario. "La La" won the poll narrowly beating Mario who was second by a few votes. "1, 2 Step" came third.

On November 1, 2005, when Simpson was a guest on MuchMusic's MuchOnDemand in Canada, "La La" received the most votes from viewers out of three of Simpson's videos and was played. Simpson correctly guessed that "La La" would win.

== Track listings ==
- UK CD1 and Australasian CD single
1. "La La" (album version) – 3:42
2. "Endless Summer" – 3:37
3. "Pieces of Me" (29 Palms remix vocal mix) – 8:41
4. "La La" (CD-ROM video) – 3:38
- UK CD2 and European CD single
1. "La La" (album version) – 3:42
2. "La La" (Sharp Boys vocal mix edit) – 4:31

== Charts ==
=== Weekly charts ===
Chart (2004–2005)	Peak position
Australia (ARIA)	10
Austria (Ö3 Austria Top 40)	46
Canada CHR/Pop Top 30 (Radio & Records)	23
CIS Airplay (TopHit)	187
Germany (GfK)	68
Hungary (Dance Top 40)	31
Hungary (Editors' Choice Top 40)	40
Ireland (IRMA)	16
Netherlands (Dutch Top 40)	25
Netherlands (Single Top 100)	62
New Zealand (Recorded Music NZ)	11
Scotland Singles (Official Charts)	6
Sweden (Sverigetopplistan)	32
UK Singles (Official Charts)	11
US Billboard Hot 100	86
US Dance Club Songs (Billboard) Sharp Boys/F. Garibay mixes	6
US Pop Airplay (Billboard)	28

=== Year-end charts ===
Chart (2005)	Position
Australia (ARIA)	54
UK Singles (OCC)	165

== Certifications ==
Region	Certification	Certified units/sales
Australia (ARIA)	Gold	35,000^{^}
United States (RIAA)	Gold	500,000^{*}
^{*} Sales figures based on certification alone.^{^} Shipments figures based on certification alone.

== Release history ==
Release dates and formats for "La La"
Region	Date	Format	Label	Ref(s).
United States	November 8, 2004	Contemporary hit radio	Geffen	
United Kingdom	January 24, 2005	CD	Polydor	
Australia	January 31, 2005	CD	Universal	
Germany	June 20, 2005	CD	Universal	
