= Pieces of Me (Ashlee Simpson song) =

2004 single by Ashlee Simpson

Single by Ashlee Simpson

from the album Autobiography
- Released: May 17, 2004
- Studio: Henson (Hollywood, California)
- Genre: Soft rock
- Length: 3:37 (album version); 3:13 (radio edit)
- Label: Geffen
- Songwriters: Ashlee Simpson; Kara DioGuardi; John Shanks
- Producer: John Shanks

Ashlee Simpson singles chronology
"Pieces of Me" (2004)	"Shadow" (2004)

Audio sample
- file; help

Music video
- "Pieces Of Me" on YouTube

"Pieces of Me" is a song by American pop/rock singer Ashlee Simpson, released as her debut single. It served as the lead single from her debut album, Autobiography (2004). The ballad, which was jointly written and composed by Simpson, Kara DioGuardi and John Shanks and produced by Shanks, is a blend of pop and rock with lyrics about finding comfort and happiness in a relationship with a new boyfriend.

Released on May 17, 2004, "Pieces of Me" peaked at number five on the US Billboard Hot 100. Outside the United States, it reached the top 10 in several countries, including Australia, Denmark, Norway, and the United Kingdom. As of 2026, it remains Simpson's most successful song and her only single to reach the top 10 on both the Billboard Hot 100 and the UK Singles Chart. Billboard ranked the song at number 97 on its 2017 list of the 100 greatest choruses of the 21st century and number 26 on its 2020 list of the 50 greatest minivan rock songs. Rolling Stone named it one of the 250 greatest songs of the 21st century in 2025, ranking it at number 208.

== Background and composition ==
The recording of "Pieces of Me" features in "Valentine's Bummer", the fourth episode of the first season of Ashlee Simpson's reality show, The Ashlee Simpson Show, and was inspired by Simpson's relationship with the musician Ryan Cabrera, a friend with whom she became romantically involved. As she said, "It was just really nice to be with somebody who's just real and who's nice — just a good person. So I wrote that about him, and when I finished it, I was so excited and so was he." The two were reported to have broken up in August 2004. In another interview, Simpson said, "It's a feel good song, it's easy to listen to and every time I perform it or listen to it or whatever, ... it just feels good."

Jeff Rothschild played drums on the track, John Shanks played guitars and bass, and Simpson and Kara DioGuardi performed background vocals.

== Critical reception ==
The song received generally favorable reviews from music critics. IGN.com said of the song that it "lopes along to a feel good melancholic guitar strum while [Simpson] waxes like any lovelorn 19-year old would about the current love of their life." Another review said that the "stringy" guitar riffs in "Pieces of Me" were "simple, yet effective", with the "catchy chorus bringing the song to life." According to one review of the album Autobiography, Simpson's singing on the track goes from "impassioned wail to innocent cooing ably." A UK review of the single called it "palatable" "as guitar-led lipstick confessionals go". It has also been described as a "perfect choice" for the album's first single, having "a tempo between fast and slow, with hints of both throughout the song."

== Commercial performance ==
"Pieces of Me" began receiving widespread radio play in the United States in May 2004, well before the album's release on July 20. According to an article in the Los Angeles Times, 97 stations added "Pieces of Me" to their play lists in the week ending on May 17, which it said was the strongest week for any single in 2004 at that point in the year. The song debuted on the Billboard Hot 100 at number 61 in June 2004 (the chart's top début for the week) and reached the top 10 in August with a rise from number 13 to number nine. It then rose to number eight the next week, where it spent two weeks before peaking at number five on the Hot 100 in September 2004. After spending one week at number five, it fell to number six and then to number seven. "Pieces of Me" remained in the top 50 on the Hot 100 chart until November 2004. It also reached number one on the Billboard Top 40 Tracks chart. The single was certified gold in October 2004 and platinum in January 2005. "Pieces of Me" was number 39 on Billboard's 2004 year end Hot 100 Singles & Tracks chart and number 36 on the year end Hot 100 Singles Sales chart.

The US CD single was released by Geffen Records on June 29, 2004, and debuted at number three in single sales (behind American Idol stars Fantasia Barrino and Diana DeGarmo) with almost 8,000 copies sold. The single includes the album version of the song as well as an instrumental. On the cover, Simpson has dark hair, and the artwork is similar to that of the album Autobiography; an earlier, promotional version of the single shows a blonde Simpson with a yellow jacket. This promotional version includes only the original version of the song.

The single was released in the United Kingdom on September 27, 2004, on two CDs; the first includes a David Garcia & High Spies remix, and the second includes remixes, a medley of snippets of songs from Autobiography ("Shadow", "Autobiography", "La La", and "Better Off"), and the "Pieces of Me" music video. "Pieces of Me" debuted at number four on the UK Singles Chart for the week ending October 3 and remained in the top 40 for seven weeks.

Simpson has described her excitement when she first heard the song on the radio:

"I was in L.A. and my sister heard me on the radio and was freaking out and called me so I turned on the radio in my apartment with my two best friends and started jumping around and freaking out."

In Australia, "Pieces of Me" made its debut on the ARIA singles chart at number 14, and peaked for two weeks at number 7 in September; it fell out of the top 40 in late November 2004. "Pieces of Me" was also accredited as a gold single in Australia. In New Zealand, the song debuted on the RIANZ top 40 singles chart at number 33 in September 2004, peaked at 32 the next week, and fell out of the top 40 after its third week.

In Germany, "Pieces of Me" reached number 26 on the singles chart, and in Austria it debuted at number 43 and peaked at 15 in its sixth week. In Switzerland, it debuted at number 17 and peaked at 11 in its third week, in October 2004. In Italy, "Pieces of Me" peaked at 24 in October 2004, in its fourth week on the top 50 singles chart after debuting at 47; after seven weeks, it fell out of the top 50. In Denmark, the song debuted at 5 and peaked at 4, after which it fell off the chart; in Sweden, it reached a peak of number 31 on the singles chart, while in Norway it stayed on the top 20 singles chart for 12 weeks, peaking at 3 in its fifth week.

In Japan, "Pieces of Me" was a popular hit on radios reaching the top spot in domestic and international top in Japan Radio. It also reached the top 5 in countries such as Hong Kong, Indonesia, Thailand and Taiwan.

== Release and promotion ==
"Pieces of Me" was released as the lead single from Autobiography on June 29, 2004. The music video for the song, directed by Stefan Smith, features Simpson (wearing a white shirt emblazoned with the word "punk" and a pink dress, as well as using Fostex T20RP headphones) and her band in the studio interspersed with clips of reality TV footage from The Ashlee Simpson Show. The video is fairly simplistic, and Simpson refers to the more elaborate video for her second single, "Shadow", as her first "real" video.

Simpson appeared on MTV's Total Request Live on May 17, 2004, and the "Pieces of Me" video was premiered on the show on this date. On June 2, she also appeared on the show and performed the song. The video did not debut on the countdown's top 10 until July 19; however, it reached number one for the first time on August 4 and remained on the countdown through September 13. The "Shadow" video premiered on the following day and took the place of "Pieces of Me" on the countdown.

Simpson has frequently performed "Pieces of Me" live, including a number of notable television performances. She sang the song at Summer Music Mania on May 20, and it aired on FOX on June 1. Simpson sang "Pieces of Me" (followed by a brief interview with Jay Leno) on the May 24, 2004, episode of The Tonight Show, and she also sang the song on the Late Show with David Letterman on July 16. She performed "Pieces of Me" (after a brief interview with Charles Gibson) on Good Morning America on July 19, the day before her album was released in the US, and on July 27, she sang it (after an interview) on Ryan Seacrest's talk show, On Air With Ryan Seacrest. On August 8 she performed "Pieces of Me" on the 2004 Teen Choice Awards, and the song also received the Song of the Summer award. On August 29, Simpson performed the song during the pre-show for the 2004 MTV Video Music Awards.

The song made its debut somewhat later in the United Kingdom, where the album was also released several months after it was in the US. In September 2004, Simpson made several notable television appearances in the UK in which she performed the song, including on Top of the Pops (September 17), Top of the Pops Saturday (September 25), CD:UK and Popworld.

Later in 2004, on the October 23 episode of Saturday Night Live season 30, Simpson performed "Pieces of Me" as her first of two songs that night; when she started to perform her second song (which was supposed to be "Autobiography"), a recording of "Pieces of Me" was mistakenly played instead, indicating that Simpson was using some sort of vocal aid. She began to do an impromptu jig (which she later named as a hoedown) when she realized she had been caught lip-syncing, and then left the stage. (She later explained it as being due to her acid reflux condition.) For her next performance, at the Radio Music Awards on October 25, Simpson poked fun at the SNL incident by having some of "Pieces of Me" play at the beginning of her performance, to suggest that she was caught in the same situation as before, only to then smile and exclaim that she was "just kidding" and begin performing "Autobiography." The incident was also parodied in Good Charlotte's "I Just Wanna Live" music video and later on Family Guy during the season 4 episode "Brian Goes Back to College" in 2005.

Simpson subsequently performed "Pieces of Me" (in addition to a performance of "La La") on Jingle Ball Rock, a television special on FOX featuring performances by a number of popular artists; it was taped on December 3 and aired on the evening of December 17. She also sang the song as part of a concert broadcast live over the Internet on December 6, and during the performance she pulled a member of the audience up on stage with her. Simpson later performed the song on Dick Clark's New Year's Rockin' Eve 2005, in which she also hosted the West Coast portion of the show.

The video for "Pieces of Me" was nominated for Best Pop Video at the 2005 MTV Video Music Awards, but lost to Kelly Clarkson's "Since U Been Gone." The video was also nominated for the same category for the 2005 MTV Australia Video Music Awards, but lost to Guy Sebastian's "Out with My Baby."

As part of the promotion for her third album, Bittersweet World, Simpson performed "Pieces of Me", together with her newer single "Little Miss Obsessive", on The Today Show on April 18, 2008.

== Track listings ==
- US CD single
1. "Pieces of Me" (album version)
2. "Pieces of Me" (instrumental)
- UK CD1
1. "Pieces of Me" (album version) – 3:37
2. "Pieces of Me" (David Garcia & High Spies remix radio edit) – 3:15
- UK CD2
1. "Pieces of Me" (radio edit) – 3:11
2. "Pieces of Me" (David Garcia & High Spies remix club mix) – 7:09
3. "Pieces of Me" (29 Palms remix vocal edit) – 4:04
4. "Album Snippets Track" – 5:20
5. "Pieces of Me" (video)
- European CD single
1. "Pieces of Me" (radio edit) – 3:11
2. "Pieces of Me" (David Garcia & High Spies remix club mix) – 7:09
- Australian CD single
1. "Pieces of Me" (radio edit) – 3:11
2. "Pieces of Me" (David Garcia & High Spies remix club mix) – 7:09
3. "Pieces of Me" (instrumental) – 3:37
4. "Pieces of Me" (video)
- Japanese CD single
1. "Pieces of Me" (radio edit) – 3:11
2. "Pieces of Me" (David Garcia & High Spies remix club mix) – 7:09
3. "Pieces of Me" (instrumental) – 3:38

== Charts ==
=== Weekly charts ===
Chart (2004–05)	Peak position
Australia (ARIA)	7
Austria (Ö3 Austria Top 40)	15
Belgium (Ultratop 50 Flanders)	42
Belgium (Ultratip Bubbling Under Wallonia)	9
Canada CHR/Pop Top 30 (Radio & Records)	6
Canada Hot AC Top 30 (Radio & Records)	2
CIS Airplay (TopHit)	112
Denmark (Tracklisten)	4
Europe (Eurochart Hot 100)	7
Germany (GfK)	26
Hungary (Editors' Choice Top 40)	30
Ireland (IRMA)	10
Italy (FIMI)	24
Netherlands (Dutch Top 40)	20
Netherlands (Single Top 100)	27
New Zealand (Recorded Music NZ)	32
Norway (VG-lista)	3
Romania (Romanian Top 100)	64
Scotland Singles (Official Charts)	5
Sweden (Sverigetopplistan)	31
Switzerland (Schweizer Hitparade)	11
UK Singles (Official Charts)	4
US Billboard Hot 100	5
US Adult Contemporary (Billboard)	30
US Adult Pop Airplay (Billboard)	4
US Pop Airplay (Billboard)	1

=== Year-end charts ===
Chart (2004)	Position
Australia (ARIA)	54
Switzerland (Schweizer Hitparade)	91
UK Singles (OCC)	123
US Billboard Hot 100	39
US Adult Top 40 (Billboard)	23
US Mainstream Top 40 (Billboard)	9

== Certifications ==
Region	Certification	Certified units/sales
Australia (ARIA)	Gold	35,000^{^}
United States (RIAA)	Gold	500,000^{*}
^{*} Sales figures based on certification alone.^{^} Shipments figures based on certification alone.

== Release history ==
Release dates and formats for "Pieces of Me"
Region	Date	Format	Label	Ref.
United States	May 17, 2004	Contemporary hit radio	Geffen	
United States	June 29, 2004	CD	Geffen	
Australia	August 2, 2004	CD	Universal	
United States	August 2, 2004	Hot AC radio	Geffen	
Japan	August 4, 2004	CD	Universal	
Germany	September 13, 2004	CD	Universal	
United Kingdom	September 27, 2004	CD	Polydor	
