= Shadow (Ashlee Simpson song) =

2004 single by Ashlee Simpson

Single by Ashlee Simpson

from the album Autobiography
- B-side: "Sorry"
- Released: September 14, 2004
- Length: 3:59
- Label: Geffen
- Songwriters: Ashlee Simpson, Kara DioGuardi, John Shanks
- Producer: John Shanks

Ashlee Simpson singles chronology
"Pieces of Me" (2004)	"Shadow" (2004)	"La La" (2004)

Audio sample
- file; help

"Shadow" is the second single by American singer and songwriter Ashlee Simpson, taken from her debut album, Autobiography (2004). The single peaked at number 57 in the United States, becoming Simpson's second Billboard Hot 100 entry; it also peaked at number 31 in Australia.

== Song information ==
"Shadow" was written by Ashlee Simpson, Kara DioGuardi and producer John Shanks. It is three minutes and fifty-seven seconds long, and is the third track on Autobiography.

The song is about feelings Simpson had (when she was about 15 or 16 years old), according to one interview of living in the shadow of the dreams and accomplishments of her famous older sister, Jessica, and finding her own identity. Although "Shadow" is noted for having somewhat dark lyrics, it concludes with a positive message, as Simpson sings that "everything's cool now" and "the past is in the past." Simpson has said that it is "about loving yourself and coming to terms with who you are"; also, in an interview on Live with Regis and Kelly on September 22, 2004, Simpson explained the song's meaning:

...a lot of people think that 'Shadow' is about my sister, but it's really about dealing with myself and ... dealing with ... the voice in your head that's like, 'Oh, everything has to be so perfect, and I have to be like this,' and ... finding my identity and saying, OK, you know, this is who I am, you know, imperfections and all, and I love myself for me, and here I am!

"Shadow" was called the "best and most personal song" on the album in a People magazine review. There has, however, also been criticism of the song's lyrics for seeming excessively dramatic in light of Simpson's apparently loving family and fortunate circumstances.

Asked in one interview about the unhappiness she expresses in "Shadow" about her childhood, and whether it's "just for the song," Simpson replied:

I was dealing with my inner demons, and my inner voices in my head. It wasn't necessarily my parents being bad parents. It was just things that I battled with in my head. Feeling second best, or feeling that they didn't love me. But the song's saying: 'Guys, I apologize, if I ever put you guys through hell. I love you, and love my life, and thank you for letting me be myself, even though I messed up at times.'

They all bawl whenever they listen to it—my sister, my parents, everybody."

Simpson also related, on another occasion, that "[w]hen my sister heard the song she cried and said, 'That's the most beautiful song I've ever heard!'"

== Music video ==
The music video for "Shadow", directed by Liz Friedlander, also deals with the theme of the song. In the video, Simpson plays two different versions of herself, blonde and brunette, who live in separate "worlds" which exist side by side. The world of the blonde Ashlee appears happy and perfect, while the brunette Ashlee seems to have more negative feelings—at one point she shoves a bowl of cereal prepared by the blonde Ashlee off a kitchen table—but eventually it is revealed that the blonde Ashlee is not as happy as she seems. At the end of the video, shadows are seen leaving the brunette Ashlee. These scenes are intercut with Simpson singing in a living room setting with her band.

The "Shadow" music video premiered on MTV's Total Request Live on September 13, 2004, and debuted on the countdown the next day at number 10. In its fourth day on the countdown, 20 September, it reached its peak at number two; Simpson herself also visited the show on this day, but did not perform due to illness. The video spent 22 total days on the countdown, with its last day being October 21.

== Chart performance ==
"Shadow" debuted at number 20 on VH1's Top 20 Countdown for the week of October 6–12, 2004, and it rose the next week to number 15. It reached number 11 for the week of 27 October–2 November and then fell to number 16 the next week.

On September 22, Simpson performed "Shadow" on two U.S. shows: Live with Regis and Kelly (she also gave an interview, quoted above) and The Tonight Show.

"Shadow" debuted on the Billboard Hot 100 chart in September at number 68 and reached a peak of number 57. It was unable to match the popularity of Simpson's first single, "Pieces of Me", which reached number five on the Billboard Hot 100. "Pieces of Me" also reached number one on the Billboard Top 40 Tracks, but "Shadow" reached only number 27. In Australia, "Shadow" was Autobiography's second single, and it reached number 31 on the ARIA singles chart in November 2004; in the same week, "Pieces of Me" was still ahead of it on the chart, at number 30. In early January 2005, after some time spent out of the ARIA top 50, "Shadow" rebounded to number 34. In the United Kingdom, the song "La La" (which was the third single in the U.S. and Australia) was the second single instead of "Shadow".

== Track listing ==
- Pock It! mini CD single
1. "Shadow" — 3:57
2. "Pieces of Me" (29 Palms remix vocal edit) — 4:04
- CD single
1. "Shadow" — 3:57
2. "Pieces of Me" (29 Palms remix vocal edit) — 4:04
3. "Sorry" (non LP version) — 3:42
4. "Shadow" (video)

== Charts ==
=== Weekly charts ===
Chart (2004–2005)	Peak position
Australia (ARIA)	31
Austria (Ö3 Austria Top 40)	60
Canada CHR/Pop Top 30 (Radio & Records)	18
Germany (GfK)	42
Switzerland (Schweizer Hitparade)	30
US Billboard Hot 100	57
US Pop Airplay (Billboard)	14
US Top 40 Tracks (Billboard)	27

=== Year-end charts ===
Chart (2004)	Position
US Mainstream Top 40 (Billboard)	87

== Personnel ==
- Vocals – Ashlee Simpson
- Drums – Kenny Aronoff
- Guitars, bass, keyboards – John Shanks
- Piano, organ – Jamie Muhoberac
- Chamberlin – Patrick Warren
- String arrangement – David Campbell
- Background vocals – Ashlee Simpson and Kara DioGuardi

== Release history ==
Release dates and formats for "Shadow"
Region	Date	Format	Label	Ref.
United States	September 14, 2004	Contemporary hit radio	Geffen	
Australia	November 8, 2004	CD	Universal	
Germany	December 20, 2004	CD	Universal	
Germany	January 15, 2005	CD	Universal	
