= Autobiography (Ashlee Simpson album) =

2004 studio album by Ashlee Simpson

Studio album by Ashlee Simpson
- Released: July 20, 2004
- Studios: Henson, Hollywood
- Genres: Pop rock; teen pop; bubblegum pop; pop punk
- Length: 44:01
- Label: Geffen
- Producer: John Shanks

Ashlee Simpson chronology
Autobiography (2004)	I Am Me (2005)

Singles from Autobiography
- 1. "Pieces of Me" Released: May 17, 2004; 2. "Shadow" Released: September 14, 2004; 3. "La La" Released: November 8, 2004

Autobiography is the debut studio album by American singer-songwriter Ashlee Simpson. Released by Geffen Records on July 20, 2004, and produced primarily by John Shanks, the album blends pop and rock while drawing on Simpson's experiences with love, heartbreak, and self-discovery.

It debuted at number one on the US Billboard 200 and was certified triple platinum by the Recording Industry Association of America (RIAA). The album has sold more than five million copies worldwide. Three singles were released: the lead single "Pieces of Me", which became a hit in several countries, followed by "Shadow" and "La La". MTV documented the making of the album in the reality series The Ashlee Simpson Show (2004–2005), which drew a large audience and served as an effective promotional vehicle.

At the time of its release, critical reception was mixed. Reviewers often praised Simpson's vocals and the album's catchy melodies, while others criticized its lack of originality, formulaic production, and limited emotional depth on some tracks. In 2025, Rolling Stone ranked Autobiography at number 237 on its list of the 250 greatest albums of the 21st century so far.

== Background ==
Simpson described the process of writing the album's twelve songs as being similar to keeping a diary, and before the album's US release she said that "My inspiration came from what I have gone through in the past three years. Every single day I was thinking of what I was going through and would write songs about it." The lyrics primarily deal with love and heartbreak; in particular, much of the album's lyrical content was inspired by Simpson's breakup with her boyfriend at the time, Josh Henderson. She has described the album as being "very honest" and "very true to my emotions"—"I wasn't afraid to say that I was hurting and how I got over it." Simpson worked closely with a number of experienced songwriters on the album. The album's producer, John Shanks—who won a Grammy in February 2005, in part for his work as producer on Autobiography—receives songwriting credit alongside Simpson on all but two songs. Kara DioGuardi also receives songwriting credit, together with Simpson and Shanks, on seven of the songs, including the three singles. The album incorporates rock as well as pop elements, which contrasts with the heavily pop-oriented music of sister, Jessica. One reviewer noted that, unlike Jessica's music, Autobiography "relies on glitzy guitars and big power-pop riffs". On her reality show, Simpson emphasized that she did not want to make her music like pop singers such as her sister or Hilary Duff; instead, she has cited musicians such as Chrissie Hynde and Joan Jett as influences.

In a 2004 interview, Simpson said that when she began seeking a recording contract record labels would not meet with her because they thought she just wanted "to be like her sister". Simpson also said that she did not want to meet with Jessica's record label (Columbia) because she wanted to be signed because of her music, rather than her sister. She eventually signed with Geffen in 2003. As for her role as co-writer of the songs, Simpson has said that she had a lot of input lyrically: "...I come up with the whole concept of the song. To me, writing is a very important thing. It's what I've always done and what I've always loved to do, and it was a big part of my wanting to do a record. So my label was amazing because they really let me have my hands in there. I got to write a lot." Simpson said of making the album: "It's a lot of work. From finding the right label to the actual recording, it took about nine months, then it was followed by the publicity work." In an extensive list of thank-yous in the album's liner notes, Simpson includes Benji and Joel Madden of the band Good Charlotte, with whom she worked on the song "Harder Everyday", which was released as an international bonus track.

== Composition ==
The title track, which was also the theme song to her MTV reality series The Ashlee Simpson Show, opens the album by introducing Simpson, who sings "got stains on my t-shirt, and I'm the biggest flirt" and "if you want my auto, want my autobiography / baby, just ask me". The Village Voice review described the song as "wrist-pumping Joan Jett rock candy", but Stylus labelled the track "an age-old trope and a boring one at that". "Pieces of Me", a song about the comfort and happiness Simpson found in her relationship with Ryan Cabrera, has been characterised as a soft rock ballad with "stringy guitar riffs". "Shadow", described by People magazine as the "most personal song" on the album, is a slower tune in which Simpson recounts playing a lesser role to her sister when she was younger, but eventually finding her own identity.

The album continues with "La La", a song with sexual lyrics that Simpson has described as "tongue-in-cheek". One reviewer described "La La" as a "punk inspired, fast beat, screaming anthem". "Love Makes the World Go Round", which epinions.com described as having a "Duff vibe", talks about the disappointment of an ending relationship. "Better Off", which has been described as a "bubbly" song and as a "chunk of pop/rock goodness", and "Love Me For Me", which has been called "Joan-Jett-esque" and which Simpson has said is about "self-appreciation" both deal with contradictory feelings about relationships. The synth-driven "Surrender" follows with Simpson consenting to a breakup, with lyrics such as "you make your misery my company"; epinions wrote that it is on this track that Simpson sounds "most loose and carefree".

"Unreachable" combines a piano line and vintage Chamberlin sounds with lyrics dealing with regrets about rushing into a relationship. Simpson has described "Nothing New" as being about her frustration with an ex-boyfriend's "dramas" until she is ultimately "finished with him", while "Giving It All Away" encourages the listener to stand on one's own feet: "hold on to your life and don't give that away", Simpson said of the song. The album's closing track, "Undiscovered" (which Simpson has described as a favorite of hers), was written after her breakup with Josh, and is described by epinions.com as a song with "haunting strings" and "mellow guitars"; in the song, Simpson ponders what might have been in a lost pairing. Non-US pressings follow with "Harder Everyday", and the United Kingdom edition adds "Sorry", while the Japanese edition closes with "Endless Summer". The US Walmart edition of the album also included an access code to download a reduced-quality version of "Sorry" on the internet.

== Promotion ==
The album and singles received considerable promotion in the US—where they sold the most copies—and other countries, and much of this focused on contrasting her with Jessica by highlighting her more rock-oriented image. This image distinction from Jessica did not mean that the two were not associated in publicity, however; the sisters appeared together in television commercials at around the time of Autobiography's release, for Pizza Hut and Ice Breakers Liquid Ice.

A key element of Simpson's promotion was The Ashlee Simpson Show, which debuted on June 16, 2004, and ran for eight episodes, achieving high ratings for cable television. Jessica's reality show, Newlyweds: Nick and Jessica, had debuted in 2003 and had proved highly successful, being credited with reviving her flagging music career; reality television proved similarly effective in helping launch Simpson's music career. It has been said that Simpson's father and manager Joe Simpson "redefined how you sell records" through his use of reality television to promote his daughters. Simpson said that she initially did not want to do the reality show but that her father persuaded her to do it because it would be about the production of her album: "...I thought that was kind of cool. You're actually seeing a deeper look into how this album got made." She also thought the show, by showcasing her own personality, would help to distinguish her from Jessica.

Geoff Mayfield, Billboard's director of charts, pointed to a combination of factors in explaining Simpson's success with Autobiography. He described Simpson as the "right thing at the right time" and said: "The MTV show is a huge catalyst, radio jumped all over the song, and her famous sister opened the door. If Jessica never happened, then Ashlee doesn't get her own show and this album doesn't happen." Zena Burns of Teen People, while noting the importance of effective promotion and Simpson's connection to Jessica, stressed the appeal of "Pieces of Me" in explaining her success: "Ashlee has an amazing promotional machine, and it doesn't hurt to have Jessica and MTV behind you, but she also came out with an insanely catchy pop single." From July 13 to July 20, the week prior to Autobiography's release, MTV.com's "The Leak" featured the album for streaming on its website. Autobiography drew 2.66 million requested streams during the time period, breaking a record previously held by Britney Spears' 2003 album In the Zone.

Simpson's publicity suffered when the performance on the October 23–24, 2004, edition of Saturday Night Live went awry. According to Simpson's publicists, her father and manager decided to use a vocal guide track because of problems she was having with her voice, which began earlier in the day and were caused by acid reflux. Although her first performance of the night—"Pieces of Me"—was successful, her second performance, which was supposed to be of "Autobiography" (at the time planned as her third single), went wrong: "Pieces of Me" mistakenly began playing, and Simpson's recorded vocals were heard when her microphone was not near her mouth. She subsequently walked off the stage and then apologized for the error during the show's closing. Some viewers accused Simpson of lip synching, and the incident received widespread coverage in the news. Simpson joked about the incident with a performance of "Autobiography" at the Radio Music Awards on October 25, 2004. Despite the low points of this period of the album's promotion, there were also significant successes. According to a Geffen press release, her December 6, 2004, AOL Music Live performance "had the biggest one-week audience ever for AOL with 1.6 million plays."

=== Singles ===
Before The Ashlee Simpson Show debuted, "Pieces of Me" began picking up substantial airplay on radio. In May 2004, a Los Angeles Times article noted that radio stations were adding the song to their playlists faster than any other song up to that point in the year. "Pieces of Me" debuted on the Billboard Hot 100 in June 2004 and reached a peak position of number five in September 2004. "Shadow" was the album's second US single; it reached a peak of number 57 on the Hot 100, failing to match the success of "Pieces of Me".

Shortly afterward, "La La" replaced "Autobiography" as the album's third single. It reached a chart peak at number 86 on the Hot 100, falling considerably short of the positions reached by her two previous singles. Simpson suffered further negative publicity at the halftime show for the Orange Bowl in Miami, Florida, on January 4, 2005, where she performed "La La" and was booed by the crowd. This may have represented backlash from the SNL debacle, as the Orange Bowl publicists stated. "Shadow" was not released in Europe (although it was the second single in Australia), where "La La" was the second single. Shortly after the Orange Bowl incident, Simpson performed the song on several television shows in the UK in January 2005; "La La" debuted and peaked just outside the top ten, and sales of Autobiography also rose considerably during the same period.

== Critical reception ==
Professional ratings
Aggregate scores
Source	Rating
Metacritic	58/100
Review scores
Source	Rating
AllMusic	3.5/5 stars
Austin Chronicle	2/5 stars
Blender	3/5 stars
E! Online	B−
Entertainment Weekly	B−
IGN	6.5/10
The New York Times	3/5 stars
Rolling Stone	2/5 stars
Slant Magazine	1.5/5 stars
Stylus	4/10

Critical reviews of Autobiography were mixed. People considered it a "passable debut" and said that it showed Simpson was a "credible talent in her own right". AllMusic called it "an unexpectedly strong debut". The Village Voice compared Autobiography favorably to Courtney Love's 2004 album, America's Sweetheart, referring particularly to Autobiography's "Fruit Stripe bubblegrunge guitars and insanely chewy melodies and an ear-tickling production job." It also praised Simpson's singing, saying that she "can pack so much contradictory emotion into a single line—a single word—that the music can barely contain it." According to Blender, all of the album's songs "paint in huge strokes"; its review also regarded Simpson's vocals positively. E! Online also praised Simpson's singing and catchy tracks, stating: "Ashlee Simpson still managed to piece together this collection of tracks that sound as if they were ripped right from the pages of her diary. Ashlee even makes you think twice about her semicharmed life. So, even if it doesn't wow you, Autobiography may surprise you."

Other critics were more negative. Rolling Stone called it "mundane... with a predictable script", and at one point described Simpson's singing as "wailing in lieu of hitting notes". In its review, the BBC said that "half the album ... feels self-indulgent and lacks substance", but also said that "in-between the formulaic, innocuous songs are a smattering of catchy pop-rock tracks." IGN.com called it "by-the-books, generic (and at times bland) pop/rock", although it did say Simpson's vocals showed maturity and promise. A writer for Stylus magazine commented that "after spending more than forty minutes with Ashlee, I feel like I don’t know her any better than I did beforehand...[and] for a record with the name Autobiography, it seems like no bigger criticism could be leveled." The New York Times said that Autobiography "is a thoroughly calculated package, aiming for the same audience that embraces Avril Lavigne and Pink."

== Commercial performance ==
In the US, Autobiography was 2004's biggest debut album by a female artist, and in September the RIAA gave the album a triple platinum certification. Following its July 20 release, it debuted at number one on the Billboard 200 chart, selling about 398,000 copies; according to Nielsen SoundScan figures Autobiography sold a total of 2,576,945 copies from the time of its release until early January 2005, making it the ninth best-selling album of 2004.

In Canada, where the album's release corresponded with the US, it sold about 3,000 copies in its first week (number 37 on the album chart); it rose on the chart to number eight at one point and went double platinum in February 2005. The album was released in the UK on October 4, 2004, and debuted at number 31 on the album charts. However, it returned to the top 40 in January 2005, rising substantially from number 91 to number 33 in the week ending January 24, following Simpson's promotion of "La La" (the album's second single in the UK, released on January 24). In Ireland, the album peaked at number 22 on the chart in late January, at the same time as "La La" was released as a single chart. The album also reached number 36 in Switzerland and number 29 in Norway. Simpson's success in album sales with Autobiography outshines that of her sister Jessica, who despite having a singing career since 1999, failed to attain major success with record sales until she appeared on her 2003 reality television show. Geffen President Jordan Schur said of Simpson's success: "It's unheard of in this business—even for a superstar—to sell this number of records," and emphasized her relative obscurity until not long before the album's release. Simpson expressed surprise at the degree of her album's success: "I just hoped my album charted. I didn't expect it to be number one in the country! It was a huge shock." In Brazil, the single "Pieces of Me" was the theme of the soap opera America and made huge success selling about 15,000 copies of the album in the country.

== Track listing ==
All tracks are written by Ashlee Simpson, Kara DioGuardi, and John Shanks, except 5 and 12 (Simpson, Shanks), 7 (Simpson, Shelly Peiken, Shanks), 9 (Simpson, Steve Fox, Stan Frazier, Billy Mann, Robbie Nevil), 11 (Simpson, John Feldmann), and 13 (Simpson, Feldmann, Benji Madden).

North American edition
No.	Title	Length
1.	"Autobiography"	3:34
2.	"Pieces of Me"	3:37
3.	"Shadow"	3:57
4.	"La La"	3:42
5.	"Love Makes the World Go Round"	3:45
6.	"Better Off"	3:27
7.	"Love Me for Me"	3:27
8.	"Surrender"	3:20
9.	"Unreachable"	3:53
10.	"Nothing New"	3:06
11.	"Giving It All Away"	2:56
12.	"Undiscovered"	4:56
Total length:		43:40

International edition (later included on the 2024 digital expanded edition)
No.	Title	Length
13.	"Harder Every Day"	3:29
Total length:		47:09

United Kingdom edition (later included on the 2024 digital expanded edition)
No.	Title	Length
14.	"Sorry"	3:42
Total length:		50:51

2024 digital expanded edition
No.	Title	Length
15.	"Endless Summer"	3:37
Total length:		54:28

Japanese CD edition
No.	Title	Length
16.	"Pieces of Me" (Music video)	3:18

== Personnel ==
Adapted from the Autobiography liner notes.

- Ashlee Simpson – vocals; background vocals (tracks: 1–4, 6–10 and 12)
- Kenny Aronoff – drums (tracks: 1, 3, 5, 8 and 10)
- John Shanks – guitars, bass; keyboards (tracks: 1, 3, 5, 7, 8, 9 and 12); background vocals (tracks: 1, 5, 7, 8 and 9)
- Kara DioGuardi – background vocals (tracks: 1–4, 6 and 10)
- Jeff Rothschild – drums (tracks: 2, 4, 11, and 12)
- Jamie Muhoberac – piano, organ (track 3)
- Patrick Warren – Chamberlin (tracks: 3 and 12)
- Abe Laboriel, Jr. – drums (tracks: 6, 7, and 9)
- John Feldmann – original programming (track: 11)
- David Campbell – string arrangement (tracks: 3 and 12)

Production

- John Shanks – producer, mixing
- Jeff Rothschild – mixing
- Mark Valentine – additional engineering
- Ted Jensen – mastering
- Jordan Schur – executive producer, A&R
- Mark Liddell – photography
- Soap Design Co. – design

== Charts ==
=== Weekly charts ===
Chart (2004)	Peak position
Australian Albums (ARIA)	40
Austrian Albums (Ö3 Austria)	37
Belgian Albums (Ultratop Flanders)	80
Canadian Albums (Billboard)	8
European Top 100 Albums (Billboard)	83
French Albums (SNEP)	96
German Albums (Offizielle Top 100)	27
Irish Albums (IRMA)	22
Japanese Albums (Oricon)	6
Norwegian Albums (VG-lista)	29
Scottish Albums (Official Charts)	23
Singaporean Albums (RIAS)	7
Swedish Albums (Sverigetopplistan)	44
Swiss Albums (Schweizer Hitparade)	36
UK Albums (Official Charts)	31
US Billboard 200	1

=== Year-end charts ===
Chart (2004)	Position
US Billboard 200	18
Worldwide Albums (IFPI)	17
Chart (2005)	Position
US Billboard 200	92

== Certifications and Sales ==
Region	Certification	Certified units/sales
Canada (Music Canada)	2× Platinum	200,000^{^}
Japan (RIAJ)	Gold	100,000^{^}
Mexico (AMPROFON)	Gold	50,000^{^}
Singapore	—	2,000
United Kingdom (BPI)	Gold	115,000
United States (RIAA)	3× Platinum	3,000,000^{^}
^{^} Shipments figures based on certification alone.

== Release history ==
Release dates and formats for Autobiography
Region	Date	Format	Label	Ref.
Canada	July 20, 2004	CD	Universal	
United States	July 20, 2004	CD	Geffen	
Japan	August 25, 2004	CD	Universal	
United Kingdom	October 3, 2004	CD	Polydor	
Germany	February 25, 2005	CD	Universal	

== Notes ==
- Patty Adams, "The Sister Who Rocks", YM, September 2004, pages 112–117.
- US and Canadian charts compiled by Billboard and Nielsen SoundScan.
- UK charts compiled by the Official Charts Company (OCC).
