= L.O.V.E. (Ashlee Simpson song) =

2005 single by Ashlee Simpson

- Australian CD single cover

Single by Ashlee Simpson

from the album I Am Me
- Released: December 6, 2005
- Genre: Pop
- Length: 2:33
- Label: Geffen
- Songwriters: Ashlee Simpson; Kara DioGuardi; John Shanks
- Producer: John Shanks

Ashlee Simpson singles chronology
"Boyfriend" (2005)	"L.O.V.E." (2005)	"Invisible" (2006)

"L.O.V.E." is a song recorded by American singer Ashlee Simpson for her second studio album, I Am Me (2005). It was written by Simpson, Kara DioGuardi and John Shanks, who also produced the song. Initially planned to be released as the lead single from the album, but it was later sent to contemporary hit radio in the United States as the second and final single on December 6, 2005. A remix of "L.O.V.E." featuring rapper Missy Elliott was released as a digital download a week later on December 13, 2005. The song peaked at number 22 in the United States, number five in Australia, number six in Hungary, and number 12 in New Zealand.

== Background ==
Like all the tracks on I Am Me, "L.O.V.E." was written by Simpson, Kara DioGuardi, and John Shanks, and produced by Shanks. The song was originally supposed to be the first single from I Am Me, but "Boyfriend" took its place. In the song, Simpson recalls her boyfriend noting that he doesn't answer the telephone, and that she doesn't even know where he goes. Annoyed, but not letting it get the best of her, she calls up her friends, and they proceed to have a party without dealing with men. Simpson has said of the song that it is "about hanging with your girlfriends and loving them for being there". She explains that "one of my girlfriends and I were listening to music and were like, there's not enough songs for your girlfriends for when you go out and leave your man behind and have a good time. Any situation I go through, I lean on my girlfriends. Like, when you get your heart broken, who do you go to? You go to your friends."

== Release and reception ==
"L.O.V.E." was also remixed by Missy Elliott. The original version peaked at number 22 in the United States. "L.O.V.E" debuted at number five on Australian top 50 singles chart, giving Simpson her fourth top-10 single in Australia. A BBC review of I Am Me called "L.O.V.E." "the pick of the album standing out by combining the attitude of Britney's "Do Somethin" with the cheerleader beats of Gwen's "Hollaback Girl" and producing a party track that's sure to become a dancefloor filler.". Rolling Stone, which gave I Am Me a negative review, described Simpson as attempting "to channel Gwen Stefani on the faux-funkdafied 'L.O.V.E.'"

== Live performances ==
On November 21, 2005, she performed the song on the Late Show with David Letterman, and on the November 22 episode of ABC's The View. On December 6, Simpson sang "L.O.V.E." as part of a performance with R&B boy band Pretty Ricky at the Billboard Music Awards; the song was combined into a medley with Pretty Ricky's "Grind with Me".

Simpson sang "L.O.V.E." on the premiere episode of CD USA, which aired on January 21, and she also sang it on the January 29 episode of TEENick on Nickelodeon, but shown on the 2006 TRL Awards on February 25, and at the MTV Australia Video Music Awards on April 12.

== Music video ==
On November 20, 2005, Simpson filmed the music video for the song at a home in Long Island, New York; it was directed by Diane Martel. The video for "L.O.V.E." premiered on December 7 on AOL's "First View" online and on December 8 on MTV's Total Request Live (TRL). It features partying and dancing, as Simpson ignores her boyfriend's calls and goes out to have fun. At the beginning of the video, she decides not to answer a call from her boyfriend and tosses her phone into a toilet; at the end of the video, after Simpson is seen returning home from a long night of partying, the phone is shown again, submerged, with 21 missed messages from her boyfriend. Although dancing is the focus of the video, the director, Martel, said she was disappointed that they had not included some things they had originally intended: a scene where Simpson slashed a guy's shirt off with a samurai sword and a scene where a chainsaw was to be used to cut furniture apart. "There was a limited amount of time", Martel said.

== Track listings ==
Digital download (Missy underground mix)

1. "L.O.V.E." (Missy underground mix featuring Missy Elliott) – 3:26

Australian CD single

1. "L.O.V.E." (album version) – 2:33
2. "L.O.V.E." (Missy underground mix featuring Missy Elliott) – 3:26
3. "Boyfriend" (Frantic remix) – 5:48
4. "L.O.V.E." (video)

== Personnel ==
Personnel are adapted from the liner notes of "L.O.V.E.".

=== Album version ===
- Ashlee Simpson – writing, background vocals
- Kara DioGuardi – writing, background vocals
- John Shanks – writing, guitars, keyboards, producer, mixer
- André Bowman – bass, keyboards, programming
- Mike Elizondo – bass
- Jeff Rothschild – drums
- Dan Chase – keyboards
- Jeff Rothschild – mixer

=== Remix ===
- Missy Elliott – writing, additional production
- The Soul Diggaz – additional writing, additional production
- Mike Widman – guitar
- Phil Les – keys

== Charts ==
=== Weekly charts ===
Chart (2005–2006)	Peak position
Australia (ARIA)	5
Hungary (Rádiós Top 40)	6
New Zealand (Recorded Music NZ)	12
Romania (Romanian Top 100)	43
US Billboard Hot 100	22
US Pop Airplay (Billboard)	27

=== Year-end charts ===
Chart (2006)	Position
Australia (ARIA)	63
Hungary (Rádiós Top 40)	61

== Release history ==
Release dates and formats for "L.O.V.E."
Region	Date	Format	Version	Label	Ref.
United States	December 6, 2005	Contemporary hit radio	Album	Geffen	
United States	December 13, 2005	Digital download	Remix	Geffen	
Australia	February 27, 2006	CD single	Various	Geffen	
