= The Ashlee Simpson Show =

- Starring: Ashlee Simpson
- Opening theme: "Autobiography" by Ashlee Simpson
- Country of origin: United States
- Original language: English
- No. of seasons: 2
- No. of episodes: 18

Production
- Running time: 25 minutes

Original release
- Network: MTV
- Release: June 16, 2004 – March 30, 2005

The Ashlee Simpson Show is a reality television series about the life of Ashlee Simpson. The first season, taped from late 2003 to mid-2004, focused on the beginnings of her career as a singer and the recording of her debut album, Autobiography. A second season, taped from late 2004 to early 2005, focused on her career after the album's release.

Consisting of eight half-hour episodes, the first season ran on MTV in the United States in the summer of 2004. The show proved quite successful and helped to establish widespread recognition for Simpson, whose album was released on July 20, 2004, a month after the show began airing, and debuted at number one in sales. Jordan Schur, the president of Simpson's record label, Geffen, said that "There's no question that it really helped expose her and her music. She's got a tremendous personality; people gravitate toward that. They want to watch her and listen to her music." The second and final season, consisting of ten episodes, aired in early 2005.

== Series overview ==
The show begins with Simpson signing her record deal with Geffen; the first season ends with the U.S. release of her album, and the second season ends with the launch of her first tour.

Much of the show deals with the process of writing and recording songs. Simpson expresses her preference for rock music and that she wants her album to reflect that; she says she does not want her album to sound like the pop music of Hilary Duff or her sister Jessica. The show ties Simpson's music together with her personal life in that many of the songs are inspired by events in her personal life, both good and bad.

The show also chronicles minor but often humorous tribulations of Simpson's life. Simpson's parents, Joe and Tina, appear frequently, as well as her sister Jessica.

== Episodes ==
=== Season 1 (2004) ===
1. "Ashlee Moves Onward and Upward" – June 16, 2004
2. "Ashlee Verses Her Label" – June 23, 2004
3. "Ashlee Rocks Ryan's World" – June 30, 2004
4. "Valentine's Bummer" – July 7, 2004
5. "Ashlee Strikes a Pose" – July 14, 2004
6. "Ashlee Performs Live" – July 21, 2004
7. "Ashlee Hits the Big Time" – July 28, 2004
8. "Ashlee Goes Platinum" – August 4, 2004

=== Season 2 (2005) ===
1. "Ashlee Heads to the Big Apple" – January 26, 2005
2. "Ashlee's Notorious Performance" – February 2, 2005
3. "Ashlee Turns 20" – February 9, 2005
4. "Ashlee Backs Up Her Vocals" — February 16, 2005
5. "New Female Artist of the Year" – February 23, 2005
6. "Jingle Ball Rock" – March 2, 2005
7. "Happy New Year!" – March 9, 2005
8. "The Orange Bowl" – March 16, 2005
9. "Puppy Love" – March 23, 2005
10. "The Show Must Go On..." – March 30, 2005

== Broadcast ==
The first season of The Ashlee Simpson Show debuted in the U.S. on June 16, 2004 and aired every Wednesday until the last episode on August 4. The show aired at 10:30 PM ET, the time slot just after Ashlee's sister Jessica Simpson's already successful reality show Newlyweds: Nick and Jessica. The second season of the show, airing in the same time slot as before and again following Newlyweds, began in the U.S. on January 26, 2005 and ended on March 30.

In Canada, the first season of The Ashlee Simpson Show began showing on MTV Canada on July 1, 2004, airing on Thursdays at 9:00 ET; the second season began airing at the same time on February 10, 2005. Also in Canada, the first season began airing on MuchMusic beginning on November 14, 2004 at 4:30 p.m. ET (having been moved up from the previously planned date of November 21). In the United Kingdom, the first episode of the first season aired on MTV UK on September 27, 2004.
