= Boyfriend (Ashlee Simpson song) =

2005 single by Ashlee Simpson

Single by Ashlee Simpson

from the album I Am Me
- Released: September 6, 2005
- Studio: Henson Recording (Hollywood, California)
- Length: 2:59
- Label: Geffen
- Songwriters: Ashlee Simpson; Kara DioGuardi; John Shanks
- Producer: John Shanks

Ashlee Simpson singles chronology
"La La" (2004)	"Boyfriend" (2005)	"L.O.V.E." (2005)

"Boyfriend" is a song by American singer Ashlee Simpson for her second studio album, I Am Me (2005). It was written by Simpson, Kara DioGuardi and John Shanks, who also produced the song. The song was released as the lead single from the album on September 6, 2005, by Geffen Records.

== Song information ==
The lyrics of the song consist of Simpson insisting to another girl that "You really got it wrong: I didn't steal your boyfriend." Simpson initially denied rumors that the song refers to an alleged relationship with Wilmer Valderrama, ex-boyfriend of Lindsay Lohan, saying "It's not about one person in particular, it's just something every girl can relate to...It's a song about [how] every girl out there sometimes thinks you stole her boyfriend. It's just making fun of that."

Simpson has, however, said that the song was her way of making fun of something she went through, and has said that she leaves the question of who the song is about up to the imagination; in one interview, Ryan Seacrest observed that she grinned every time she denied that it was about "anyone in particular". During a 2018 taping of Watch What Happens Live with Andy Cohen, host Andy Cohen asked Simpson about the song in a game of 'Plead the Fifth' to which she confirmed that the song is about Lohan and Valderrama.

The song has been described as "a punky love triangle jam". One review noted its rock guitar positively while saying that the song lacked "distinctiveness". Originally, "L.O.V.E." had been planned to be released as the first single from I Am Me, but "Boyfriend" soon replaced it ("L.O.V.E." did, however, become the album's second single). Months after it was promoted in the U.S., "Boyfriend" began to be promoted in the UK; Simpson went to the UK and performed the song on television shows there in January and February 2006. It was the only song from I Am Me released in the UK due to the commitments Simpson had in the U.S.

== Chart performance ==
"Boyfriend" debuted on the Billboard Hot 100 in September at number 71 thanks in part to its strong downloads, and in its second week of release, it climbed from number 71 to number 24 (also rising from number 32 to number seven on the Hot Digital Songs chart), making it Simpson's second biggest hit on the Hot 100 to date ("Pieces of Me" reached number five on the Hot 100 in 2004). Though it continued to drop for a couple of weeks after reaching number 24, it later rebounded on the charts and hit a new peak of number 19, making "Boyfriend" Simpson's second top twenty U.S. hit. In its 17th week on the chart, after falling out of the top 50, "Boyfriend" rebounded from number 75 to number 34; this put it ahead of "L.O.V.E.", Simpson's second I Am Me single, which was at number 36 and also rising on the Hot 100.

"Boyfriend" was Simpson's third song to reach the top 10 in Australia, where it debuted on the chart for the week ending October 31 and had the highest debut of the week at number eight; this was her highest debut to date on the ARIA chart. However, it wasn't able to be her highest peak ("Pieces of Me" reached number seven), since it fell to number nine on the following week, then to number 10 in its third week on the chart and to number 12 in its fourth week. "Boyfriend" was also accredited as a gold single in Australia. In the UK, "Boyfriend" was released on January 30, 2006, and charted in early February. It debuted and peaked at number 12 (spending four weeks in the top 40), her lowest charting single so far (although it was her third top 20 hit), behind "Pieces of Me" (peaking at number four) and "La La" (peaking at number 11).

"Boyfriend" was on the RIANZ Top 40 Singles chart in New Zealand from November 2005 to January 2006. The song debuted at number 23 in early November, where it remained in its second week, before rising to number 21 in its third week. It then fell to number 30 before rising back to number 26 in its fifth week. In its sixth week it fell again to number 37, and was then off the chart for two weeks before returning at number 40; subsequently it fell off the chart again for one week and then returned at number 37 for its eighth and final week on the chart. The song reached number 19 in Norway. In Austria, it debuted and peaked at number 45.

== Music video ==
The single's music video, directed by Marc Webb, was filmed in Los Angeles, California over two days, August 31 – September 1, 2005. It was the subject of an episode of the MTV show Making the Video that aired on September 12, with the completed video premiering at the end of the episode. Simpson appeared to premiere the video on Total Request Live on September 13, and it debuted on the TRL top ten countdown on September 14 at number nine, rising to number three the next day, and reaching number one on September 20. It spent a total of three days at number one, and was on the countdown for 32 days, with its last day being November 7.

The video starts off with a car chase as Simpson is pursued by the police. Eventually she evades them and reaches a junkyard, where she and her band perform the song before a crowd of young people. At the end of the video Simpson jumps into the arms of Efren Ramirez, and he carries her away. The music video won the award for Best Pop Video at the MTV Australia Video Music Awards in April 2006.

== Live performances ==
Simpson performed "Boyfriend" on Sessions@AOL on the Internet and subsequently on Saturday Night Live on the October 8/9 episode, as the second of her two performances that night (the first being "Catch Me When I Fall"). On the album's U.S. release date, October 18, she performed the song on Good Morning America and Total Request Live, and then on the October 21 episode of The Tonight Show and the October 24 episode of The Ellen DeGeneres Show. Aside from these performances, she also sings "Boyfriend" on tour. In January 2006, Simpson performed the song on Top of the Pops Reloaded in the UK. Simpson then went on to perform "Boyfriend" on the UK's Top of the Pops on February 5. On April 12, she sang "Boyfriend" at the MTV Australia Video Music Awards (which she also hosted), before starting to sing "L.O.V.E."

== Track listings ==
- UK CD1
1. "Boyfriend"
2. "Boyfriend" (Garcia & Page remix)
3. "La La" (Fernando Garibay edit)
4. "Boyfriend" (video)
- UK CD2
1. "Boyfriend"
2. "Pieces of Me"
- Benelux CD single
1. "Boyfriend" – 2:59
2. "Boyfriend" (Frantic Remix) – 5:48
- Australian CD single
1. "Boyfriend"
2. "Boyfriend" (instrumental)
3. "La La" (Fernando Garibay edit)
4. "Boyfriend" (video)

== Charts ==
=== Weekly charts ===
Chart (2005–2006)	Peak position
Australia (ARIA)	8
Austria (Ö3 Austria Top 40)	45
Belgium (Ultratop 50 Flanders)	34
Europe (European Hot 100 Singles)	46
Germany (GfK)	56
Hungary (Dance Top 40)	40
Ireland (IRMA)	13
Netherlands (Dutch Top 40 Tipparade)	3
Netherlands (Single Top 100)	59
New Zealand (Recorded Music NZ)	21
Norway (VG-lista)	19
Scottish Singles Sales (Official Charts)	7
UK Singles (Official Charts)	12
US Billboard Hot 100	19
US Dance Club Songs (Billboard)	19
US Pop 100 (Billboard)	18
US Pop Airplay (Billboard)	20

=== Year-end charts ===
Chart (2005)	Position
US Mainstream Top 40 (Billboard)	94

== Certifications ==
Region	Certification	Certified units/sales
Australia (ARIA)	Gold	35,000^{^}
^{^} Shipments figures based on certification alone.

== Release history ==
Release dates and formats for "Boyfriend"
Region	Date	Format	Label	Ref(s).
United States	September 6, 2005	Contemporary hit radio	Geffen	
Australia	October 24, 2005	CD single	Geffen	
United Kingdom	January 30, 2006	CD single	Geffen	
Germany	March 31, 2006	CD single	Geffen	
